The Lepidoptera of Lithuania consist of both the butterflies and moths recorded from Lithuania.

Butterflies

Hesperiidae
Carcharodus alceae (Esper, 1780)
Carcharodus floccifera (Zeller, 1847)
Carterocephalus palaemon (Pallas, 1771)
Carterocephalus silvicola (Meigen, 1829)
Erynnis tages (Linnaeus, 1758)
Hesperia comma (Linnaeus, 1758)
Heteropterus morpheus (Pallas, 1771)
Ochlodes sylvanus (Esper, 1777)
Pyrgus alveus (Hübner, 1803)
Pyrgus carthami (Hübner, 1813)
Pyrgus malvae (Linnaeus, 1758)
Pyrgus serratulae (Rambur, 1839)
Thymelicus lineola (Ochsenheimer, 1808)
Thymelicus sylvestris (Poda, 1761)

Lycaenidae
Agriades optilete (Knoch, 1781)
Aricia agestis (Denis & Schiffermüller, 1775)
Aricia artaxerxes (Fabricius, 1793)
Callophrys rubi (Linnaeus, 1758)
Celastrina argiolus (Linnaeus, 1758)
Cupido minimus (Fuessly, 1775)
Cupido argiades (Pallas, 1771)
Cyaniris semiargus (Rottemburg, 1775)
Eumedonia eumedon (Esper, 1780)
Favonius quercus (Linnaeus, 1758)
Glaucopsyche alexis (Poda, 1761)
Lycaena alciphron (Rottemburg, 1775)
Lycaena dispar (Haworth, 1802)
Lycaena helle (Denis & Schiffermüller, 1775)
Lycaena hippothoe (Linnaeus, 1761)
Lycaena phlaeas (Linnaeus, 1761)
Lycaena tityrus (Poda, 1761)
Lycaena virgaureae (Linnaeus, 1758)
Lysandra bellargus (Rottemburg, 1775)
Lysandra coridon (Poda, 1761)
Phengaris alcon (Denis & Schiffermüller, 1775)
Phengaris arion (Linnaeus, 1758)
Phengaris teleius (Bergstrasser, 1779)
Plebejus argus (Linnaeus, 1758)
Plebejus argyrognomon (Bergstrasser, 1779)
Plebejus idas (Linnaeus, 1761)
Polyommatus amandus (Schneider, 1792)
Polyommatus dorylas (Denis & Schiffermüller, 1775)
Polyommatus icarus (Rottemburg, 1775)
Pseudophilotes baton (Bergstrasser, 1779)
Satyrium ilicis (Esper, 1779)
Satyrium pruni (Linnaeus, 1758)
Satyrium spini (Denis & Schiffermüller, 1775)
Satyrium w-album (Knoch, 1782)
Thecla betulae (Linnaeus, 1758)

Nymphalidae
Aglais io (Linnaeus, 1758)
Aglais urticae (Linnaeus, 1758)
Apatura ilia (Denis & Schiffermüller, 1775)
Apatura iris (Linnaeus, 1758)
Aphantopus hyperantus (Linnaeus, 1758)
Araschnia levana (Linnaeus, 1758)
Argynnis paphia (Linnaeus, 1758)
Argynnis laodice (Pallas, 1771)
Boloria aquilonaris (Stichel, 1908)
Boloria dia (Linnaeus, 1767)
Boloria euphrosyne (Linnaeus, 1758)
Boloria frigga (Becklin, 1791)
Boloria selene (Denis & Schiffermüller, 1775)
Boloria thore (Hübner, 1803)
Boloria eunomia (Esper, 1799)
Brenthis daphne (Bergstrasser, 1780)
Brenthis hecate (Denis & Schiffermüller, 1775)
Brenthis ino (Rottemburg, 1775)
Coenonympha arcania (Linnaeus, 1761)
Coenonympha glycerion (Borkhausen, 1788)
Coenonympha hero (Linnaeus, 1761)
Coenonympha pamphilus (Linnaeus, 1758)
Coenonympha tullia (Muller, 1764)
Erebia aethiops (Esper, 1777)
Erebia ligea (Linnaeus, 1758)
Euphydryas aurinia (Rottemburg, 1775)
Euphydryas maturna (Linnaeus, 1758)
Fabriciana adippe (Denis & Schiffermüller, 1775)
Fabriciana niobe (Linnaeus, 1758)
Hipparchia hermione (Linnaeus, 1764)
Hipparchia statilinus (Hufnagel, 1766)
Hipparchia semele (Linnaeus, 1758)
Hyponephele lycaon (Rottemburg, 1775)
Issoria lathonia (Linnaeus, 1758)
Lasiommata maera (Linnaeus, 1758)
Lasiommata megera (Linnaeus, 1767)
Lasiommata petropolitana (Fabricius, 1787)
Limenitis camilla (Linnaeus, 1764)
Limenitis populi (Linnaeus, 1758)
Lopinga achine (Scopoli, 1763)
Maniola jurtina (Linnaeus, 1758)
Melanargia galathea (Linnaeus, 1758)
Melitaea athalia (Rottemburg, 1775)
Melitaea aurelia Nickerl, 1850
Melitaea cinxia (Linnaeus, 1758)
Melitaea diamina (Lang, 1789)
Melitaea didyma (Esper, 1778)
Melitaea phoebe (Denis & Schiffermüller, 1775)
Nymphalis antiopa (Linnaeus, 1758)
Nymphalis polychloros (Linnaeus, 1758)
Nymphalis vaualbum (Denis & Schiffermüller, 1775)
Nymphalis xanthomelas (Esper, 1781)
Oeneis jutta (Hübner, 1806)
Pararge aegeria (Linnaeus, 1758)
Polygonia c-album (Linnaeus, 1758)
Speyeria aglaja (Linnaeus, 1758)
Vanessa atalanta (Linnaeus, 1758)
Vanessa cardui (Linnaeus, 1758)

Papilionidae
Iphiclides podalirius (Linnaeus, 1758)
Papilio machaon Linnaeus, 1758
Parnassius mnemosyne (Linnaeus, 1758)

Pieridae
Anthocharis cardamines (Linnaeus, 1758)
Aporia crataegi (Linnaeus, 1758)
Colias alfacariensis Ribbe, 1905
Colias croceus (Fourcroy, 1785)
Colias hyale (Linnaeus, 1758)
Colias myrmidone (Esper, 1781)
Colias palaeno (Linnaeus, 1761)
Gonepteryx rhamni (Linnaeus, 1758)
Leptidea reali Reissinger, 1990
Leptidea sinapis (Linnaeus, 1758)
Pieris brassicae (Linnaeus, 1758)
Pieris napi (Linnaeus, 1758)
Pieris rapae (Linnaeus, 1758)
Pontia chloridice (Hübner, 1813)
Pontia edusa (Fabricius, 1777)

Riodinidae
Hamearis lucina (Linnaeus, 1758)

Moths

Adelidae
Adela croesella (Scopoli, 1763)
Adela cuprella (Denis & Schiffermüller, 1775)
Adela reaumurella (Linnaeus, 1758)
Cauchas fibulella (Denis & Schiffermüller, 1775)
Cauchas rufimitrella (Scopoli, 1763)
Nematopogon adansoniella (Villers, 1789)
Nematopogon magna (Zeller, 1878)
Nematopogon metaxella (Hübner, 1813)
Nematopogon pilella (Denis & Schiffermüller, 1775)
Nematopogon robertella (Clerck, 1759)
Nematopogon schwarziellus Zeller, 1839
Nematopogon swammerdamella (Linnaeus, 1758)
Nemophora bellela (Walker, 1863)
Nemophora cupriacella (Hübner, 1819)
Nemophora degeerella (Linnaeus, 1758)
Nemophora metallica (Poda, 1761)
Nemophora minimella (Denis & Schiffermüller, 1775)

Alucitidae
Alucita hexadactyla Linnaeus, 1758

Argyresthiidae
Argyresthia albistria (Haworth, 1828)
Argyresthia aurulentella Stainton, 1849
Argyresthia bonnetella (Linnaeus, 1758)
Argyresthia brockeella (Hübner, 1813)
Argyresthia conjugella Zeller, 1839
Argyresthia curvella (Linnaeus, 1761)
Argyresthia glaucinella Zeller, 1839
Argyresthia goedartella (Linnaeus, 1758)
Argyresthia ivella (Haworth, 1828)
Argyresthia pruniella (Clerck, 1759)
Argyresthia pygmaeella (Denis & Schiffermüller, 1775)
Argyresthia retinella Zeller, 1839
Argyresthia semifusca (Haworth, 1828)
Argyresthia bergiella (Ratzeburg, 1840)
Argyresthia dilectella Zeller, 1847
Argyresthia glabratella (Zeller, 1847)
Argyresthia illuminatella Zeller, 1839
Argyresthia praecocella Zeller, 1839

Autostichidae
Symmoca signatella Herrich-Schäffer, 1854

Batrachedridae
Batrachedra pinicolella (Zeller, 1839)
Batrachedra praeangusta (Haworth, 1828)

Bedelliidae
Bedellia somnulentella (Zeller, 1847)

Blastobasidae
Blastobasis phycidella (Zeller, 1839)
Hypatopa binotella (Thunberg, 1794)
Hypatopa inunctella Zeller, 1839

Brahmaeidae
Lemonia dumi (Linnaeus, 1761)

Bucculatricidae
Bucculatrix albedinella (Zeller, 1839)
Bucculatrix bechsteinella (Bechstein & Scharfenberg, 1805)
Bucculatrix cidarella (Zeller, 1839)
Bucculatrix cristatella (Zeller, 1839)
Bucculatrix demaryella (Duponchel, 1840)
Bucculatrix frangutella (Goeze, 1783)
Bucculatrix gnaphaliella (Treitschke, 1833)
Bucculatrix nigricomella (Zeller, 1839)
Bucculatrix ratisbonensis Stainton, 1861
Bucculatrix rhamniella Herrich-Schäffer, 1855
Bucculatrix thoracella (Thunberg, 1794)
Bucculatrix ulmella Zeller, 1848

Carposinidae
Carposina berberidella Herrich-Schäffer, 1854

Chimabachidae
Dasystoma salicella (Hübner, 1796)
Diurnea fagella (Denis & Schiffermüller, 1775)
Diurnea lipsiella (Denis & Schiffermüller, 1775)

Choreutidae
Anthophila fabriciana (Linnaeus, 1767)
Choreutis pariana (Clerck, 1759)
Prochoreutis myllerana (Fabricius, 1794)
Prochoreutis sehestediana (Fabricius, 1776)
Prochoreutis ultimana (Krulikovsky, 1909)

Coleophoridae
Augasma aeratella (Zeller, 1839)
Coleophora absinthii Wocke, 1877
Coleophora adspersella Benander, 1939
Coleophora ahenella Heinemann, 1877
Coleophora albella (Thunberg, 1788)
Coleophora albicans Zeller, 1849
Coleophora albicostella (Duponchel, 1842)
Coleophora albidella (Denis & Schiffermüller, 1775)
Coleophora albitarsella Zeller, 1849
Coleophora alcyonipennella (Kollar, 1832)
Coleophora alnifoliae Barasch, 1934
Coleophora alticolella Zeller, 1849
Coleophora anatipenella (Hübner, 1796)
Coleophora antennariella Herrich-Schäffer, 1861
Coleophora argentula (Stephens, 1834)
Coleophora artemisicolella Bruand, 1855
Coleophora ballotella (Fischer v. Röslerstamm, 1839)
Coleophora betulella Heinemann, 1877
Coleophora binderella (Kollar, 1832)
Coleophora binotapennella (Duponchel, 1843)
Coleophora brevipalpella Wocke, 1874
Coleophora caelebipennella Zeller, 1839
Coleophora caespititiella Zeller, 1839
Coleophora clypeiferella Hofmann, 1871
Coleophora colutella (Fabricius, 1794)
Coleophora conspicuella Zeller, 1849
Coleophora coronillae Zeller, 1849
Coleophora currucipennella Zeller, 1839
Coleophora deauratella Lienig & Zeller, 1846
Coleophora dianthi Herrich-Schäffer, 1855
Coleophora directella Zeller, 1849
Coleophora flavipennella (Duponchel, 1843)
Coleophora frischella (Linnaeus, 1758)
Coleophora fuscocuprella Herrich-Schäffer, 1855
Coleophora galbulipennella Zeller, 1838
Coleophora gallipennella (Hübner, 1796)
Coleophora glaucicolella Wood, 1892
Coleophora glitzella Hofmann, 1869
Coleophora gnaphalii Zeller, 1839
Coleophora graminicolella Heinemann, 1876
Coleophora granulatella Zeller, 1849
Coleophora gryphipennella (Hübner, 1796)
Coleophora hemerobiella (Scopoli, 1763)
Coleophora ibipennella Zeller, 1849
Coleophora idaeella Hofmann, 1869
Coleophora kuehnella (Goeze, 1783)
Coleophora laricella (Hübner, 1817)
Coleophora ledi Stainton, 1860
Coleophora lewandowskii (Toll, 1953)
Coleophora limosipennella (Duponchel, 1843)
Coleophora lineolea (Haworth, 1828)
Coleophora lithargyrinella Zeller, 1849
Coleophora lixella Zeller, 1849
Coleophora lusciniaepennella (Treitschke, 1833)
Coleophora lutipennella (Zeller, 1838)
Coleophora mayrella (Hübner, 1813)
Coleophora milvipennis Zeller, 1839
Coleophora murinella Tengstrom, 1848
Coleophora niveistrigella Wocke, 1877
Coleophora nutantella Muhlig & Frey, 1857
Coleophora onobrychiella Zeller, 1849
Coleophora orbitella Zeller, 1849
Coleophora otidipennella (Hübner, 1817)
Coleophora paripennella Zeller, 1839
Coleophora pennella (Denis & Schiffermüller, 1775)
Coleophora peribenanderi Toll, 1943
Coleophora plumbella Kanerva, 1941
Coleophora polonicella Zeller, 1865
Coleophora pratella Zeller, 1871
Coleophora prunifoliae Doets, 1944
Coleophora ptarmicia Walsingham, 1910
Coleophora pyrrhulipennella Zeller, 1839
Coleophora ramosella Zeller, 1849
Coleophora saturatella Stainton, 1850
Coleophora scabrida Toll, 1959
Coleophora serpylletorum Hering, 1889
Coleophora serratella (Linnaeus, 1761)
Coleophora siccifolia Stainton, 1856
Coleophora silenella Herrich-Schäffer, 1855
Coleophora solitariella Zeller, 1849
Coleophora spinella (Schrank, 1802)
Coleophora squalorella Zeller, 1849
Coleophora squamosella Stainton, 1856
Coleophora sternipennella (Zetterstedt, 1839)
Coleophora striatipennella Nylander in Tengstrom, 1848
Coleophora succursella Herrich-Schäffer, 1855
Coleophora taeniipennella Herrich-Schäffer, 1855
Coleophora tamesis Waters, 1929
Coleophora tanaceti Muhlig, 1865
Coleophora therinella Tengstrom, 1848
Coleophora trifolii (Curtis, 1832)
Coleophora trigeminella Fuchs, 1881
Coleophora trochilella (Duponchel, 1843)
Coleophora uliginosella Glitz, 1872
Coleophora unipunctella Zeller, 1849
Coleophora versurella Zeller, 1849
Coleophora vestianella (Linnaeus, 1758)
Coleophora vibicigerella Zeller, 1839
Coleophora violacea (Strom, 1783)
Coleophora virgaureae Stainton, 1857
Coleophora vitisella Gregson, 1856
Coleophora vulnerariae Zeller, 1839
Coleophora zelleriella Heinemann, 1854
Metriotes lutarea (Haworth, 1828)

Cosmopterigidae
Cosmopterix lienigiella Zeller, 1846
Cosmopterix orichalcea Stainton, 1861
Cosmopterix scribaiella Zeller, 1850
Eteobalea anonymella (Riedl, 1965)
Limnaecia phragmitella Stainton, 1851
Pancalia leuwenhoekella (Linnaeus, 1761)
Pancalia schwarzella (Fabricius, 1798)
Sorhagenia janiszewskae Riedl, 1962
Sorhagenia rhamniella (Zeller, 1839)

Cossidae
Acossus terebra (Denis & Schiffermüller, 1775)
Cossus cossus (Linnaeus, 1758)
Phragmataecia castaneae (Hübner, 1790)
Zeuzera pyrina (Linnaeus, 1761)

Crambidae
Acentria ephemerella (Denis & Schiffermüller, 1775)
Agriphila aeneociliella (Eversmann, 1844)
Agriphila deliella (Hübner, 1813)
Agriphila inquinatella (Denis & Schiffermüller, 1775)
Agriphila poliellus (Treitschke, 1832)
Agriphila selasella (Hübner, 1813)
Agriphila straminella (Denis & Schiffermüller, 1775)
Agriphila tristella (Denis & Schiffermüller, 1775)
Agrotera nemoralis (Scopoli, 1763)
Anania coronata (Hufnagel, 1767)
Anania funebris (Strom, 1768)
Anania fuscalis (Denis & Schiffermüller, 1775)
Anania hortulata (Linnaeus, 1758)
Anania lancealis (Denis & Schiffermüller, 1775)
Anania perlucidalis (Hübner, 1809)
Anania stachydalis (Germar, 1821)
Anania terrealis (Treitschke, 1829)
Anania verbascalis (Denis & Schiffermüller, 1775)
Calamotropha paludella (Hübner, 1824)
Cataclysta lemnata (Linnaeus, 1758)
Catoptria falsella (Denis & Schiffermüller, 1775)
Catoptria fulgidella (Hübner, 1813)
Catoptria lythargyrella (Hübner, 1796)
Catoptria margaritella (Denis & Schiffermüller, 1775)
Catoptria permiacus (W. Petersen, 1924)
Catoptria permutatellus (Herrich-Schäffer, 1848)
Catoptria pinella (Linnaeus, 1758)
Catoptria verellus (Zincken, 1817)
Chilo phragmitella (Hübner, 1805)
Chrysoteuchia culmella (Linnaeus, 1758)
Crambus alienellus Germar & Kaulfuss, 1817
Crambus ericella (Hübner, 1813)
Crambus hamella (Thunberg, 1788)
Crambus heringiellus Herrich-Schäffer, 1848
Crambus lathoniellus (Zincken, 1817)
Crambus pascuella (Linnaeus, 1758)
Crambus perlella (Scopoli, 1763)
Crambus pratella (Linnaeus, 1758)
Crambus silvella (Hübner, 1813)
Crambus uliginosellus Zeller, 1850
Cynaeda dentalis (Denis & Schiffermüller, 1775)
Diasemia reticularis (Linnaeus, 1761)
Donacaula forficella (Thunberg, 1794)
Donacaula mucronella (Denis & Schiffermüller, 1775)
Ecpyrrhorrhoe rubiginalis (Hübner, 1796)
Elophila nymphaeata (Linnaeus, 1758)
Epascestria pustulalis (Hübner, 1823)
Euchromius ocellea (Haworth, 1811)
Eudonia lacustrata (Panzer, 1804)
Eudonia laetella (Zeller, 1846)
Eudonia mercurella (Linnaeus, 1758)
Eudonia murana (Curtis, 1827)
Eudonia pallida (Curtis, 1827)
Eudonia sudetica (Zeller, 1839)
Eudonia truncicolella (Stainton, 1849)
Evergestis aenealis (Denis & Schiffermüller, 1775)
Evergestis extimalis (Scopoli, 1763)
Evergestis forficalis (Linnaeus, 1758)
Evergestis frumentalis (Linnaeus, 1761)
Evergestis pallidata (Hufnagel, 1767)
Friedlanderia cicatricella (Hübner, 1824)
Heliothela wulfeniana (Scopoli, 1763)
Loxostege sticticalis (Linnaeus, 1761)
Loxostege turbidalis (Treitschke, 1829)
Mecyna flavalis (Denis & Schiffermüller, 1775)
Nascia cilialis (Hübner, 1796)
Nomophila noctuella (Denis & Schiffermüller, 1775)
Nymphula nitidulata (Hufnagel, 1767)
Ostrinia nubilalis (Hübner, 1796)
Ostrinia palustralis (Hübner, 1796)
Parapoynx stratiotata (Linnaeus, 1758)
Paratalanta hyalinalis (Hübner, 1796)
Paratalanta pandalis (Hübner, 1825)
Pediasia aridella (Thunberg, 1788)
Pediasia contaminella (Hübner, 1796)
Pediasia fascelinella (Hübner, 1813)
Pediasia luteella (Denis & Schiffermüller, 1775)
Pediasia truncatellus (Zetterstedt, 1839)
Platytes alpinella (Hübner, 1813)
Platytes cerussella (Denis & Schiffermüller, 1775)
Pleuroptya ruralis (Scopoli, 1763)
Psammotis pulveralis (Hübner, 1796)
Pyrausta aerealis (Hübner, 1793)
Pyrausta aurata (Scopoli, 1763)
Pyrausta cingulata (Linnaeus, 1758)
Pyrausta nigrata (Scopoli, 1763)
Pyrausta ostrinalis (Hübner, 1796)
Pyrausta porphyralis (Denis & Schiffermüller, 1775)
Pyrausta purpuralis (Linnaeus, 1758)
Schoenobius gigantella (Denis & Schiffermüller, 1775)
Scirpophaga praelata (Scopoli, 1763)
Scoparia ambigualis (Treitschke, 1829)
Scoparia ancipitella (La Harpe, 1855)
Scoparia basistrigalis Knaggs, 1866
Sitochroa palealis (Denis & Schiffermüller, 1775)
Sitochroa verticalis (Linnaeus, 1758)
Thisanotia chrysonuchella (Scopoli, 1763)
Udea accolalis (Zeller, 1867)
Udea costalis (Eversmann, 1852)
Udea decrepitalis (Herrich-Schäffer, 1848)
Udea fulvalis (Hübner, 1809)
Udea hamalis (Thunberg, 1788)
Udea inquinatalis (Lienig & Zeller, 1846)
Udea lutealis (Hübner, 1809)
Udea olivalis (Denis & Schiffermüller, 1775)
Udea prunalis (Denis & Schiffermüller, 1775)

Douglasiidae
Klimeschia transversella (Zeller, 1839)
Tinagma balteolella (Fischer von Röslerstamm, 1841)
Tinagma ocnerostomella (Stainton, 1850)
Tinagma perdicella Zeller, 1839

Drepanidae
Achlya flavicornis (Linnaeus, 1758)
Drepana curvatula (Borkhausen, 1790)
Drepana falcataria (Linnaeus, 1758)
Falcaria lacertinaria (Linnaeus, 1758)
Habrosyne pyritoides (Hufnagel, 1766)
Ochropacha duplaris (Linnaeus, 1761)
Polyploca ridens (Fabricius, 1787)
Sabra harpagula (Esper, 1786)
Tethea ocularis (Linnaeus, 1767)
Tethea or (Denis & Schiffermüller, 1775)
Tetheella fluctuosa (Hübner, 1803)
Thyatira batis (Linnaeus, 1758)
Watsonalla binaria (Hufnagel, 1767)

Elachistidae
Agonopterix alstromeriana (Clerck, 1759)
Agonopterix angelicella (Hübner, 1813)
Agonopterix arenella (Denis & Schiffermüller, 1775)
Agonopterix assimilella (Treitschke, 1832)
Agonopterix capreolella (Zeller, 1839)
Agonopterix ciliella (Stainton, 1849)
Agonopterix cnicella (Treitschke, 1832)
Agonopterix conterminella (Zeller, 1839)
Agonopterix heracliana (Linnaeus, 1758)
Agonopterix hypericella (Hübner, 1817)
Agonopterix kaekeritziana (Linnaeus, 1767)
Agonopterix laterella (Denis & Schiffermüller, 1775)
Agonopterix liturosa (Haworth, 1811)
Agonopterix multiplicella (Erschoff, 1877)
Agonopterix nervosa (Haworth, 1811)
Agonopterix ocellana (Fabricius, 1775)
Agonopterix pallorella (Zeller, 1839)
Agonopterix parilella (Treitschke, 1835)
Agonopterix propinquella (Treitschke, 1835)
Agonopterix purpurea (Haworth, 1811)
Agonopterix selini (Heinemann, 1870)
Agonopterix senecionis (Nickerl, 1864)
Anchinia cristalis (Scopoli, 1763)
Anchinia daphnella (Denis & Schiffermüller, 1775)
Blastodacna atra (Haworth, 1828)
Chrysoclista linneella (Clerck, 1759)
Depressaria albipunctella (Denis & Schiffermüller, 1775)
Depressaria artemisiae Nickerl, 1864
Depressaria badiella (Hübner, 1796)
Depressaria chaerophylli Zeller, 1839
Depressaria daucella (Denis & Schiffermüller, 1775)
Depressaria depressana (Fabricius, 1775)
Depressaria emeritella Stainton, 1849
Depressaria leucocephala Snellen, 1884
Depressaria olerella Zeller, 1854
Depressaria pimpinellae Zeller, 1839
Depressaria pulcherrimella Stainton, 1849
Depressaria radiella (Goeze, 1783)
Depressaria sordidatella Tengstrom, 1848
Elachista argentella (Clerck, 1759)
Elachista bisulcella (Duponchel, 1843)
Elachista dispilella Zeller, 1839
Elachista pollinariella Zeller, 1839
Elachista pullicomella Zeller, 1839
Elachista subalbidella Schlager, 1847
Elachista albidella Nylander, 1848
Elachista albifrontella (Hübner, 1817)
Elachista alpinella Stainton, 1854
Elachista anserinella Zeller, 1839
Elachista canapennella (Hübner, 1813)
Elachista cinereopunctella (Haworth, 1828)
Elachista consortella Stainton, 1851
Elachista elegans Frey, 1859
Elachista eleochariella Stainton, 1851
Elachista freyerella (Hübner, 1825)
Elachista gleichenella (Fabricius, 1781)
Elachista humilis Zeller, 1850
Elachista luticomella Zeller, 1839
Elachista maculicerusella (Bruand, 1859)
Elachista poae Stainton, 1855
Elachista pomerana Frey, 1870
Elachista serricornis Stainton, 1854
Elachista utonella Frey, 1856
Ethmia bipunctella (Fabricius, 1775)
Ethmia pusiella (Linnaeus, 1758)
Ethmia quadrillella (Goeze, 1783)
Ethmia terminella T. B. Fletcher, 1938
Exaeretia mongolicella (Christoph, 1882)
Exaeretia praeustella (Rebel, 1917)
Exaeretia allisella Stainton, 1849
Heinemannia laspeyrella (Hübner, 1796)
Hypercallia citrinalis (Scopoli, 1763)
Levipalpus hepatariella (Lienig & Zeller, 1846)
Luquetia lobella (Denis & Schiffermüller, 1775)
Orophia ferrugella (Denis & Schiffermüller, 1775)
Perittia farinella (Thunberg, 1794)
Perittia herrichiella (Herrich-Schäffer, 1855)
Perittia obscurepunctella (Stainton, 1848)
Semioscopis avellanella (Hübner, 1793)
Semioscopis oculella (Thunberg, 1794)
Semioscopis steinkellneriana (Denis & Schiffermüller, 1775)
Semioscopis strigulana (Denis & Schiffermüller, 1775)
Stephensia brunnichella (Linnaeus, 1767)

Endromidae
Endromis versicolora (Linnaeus, 1758)

Epermeniidae
Epermenia chaerophyllella (Goeze, 1783)
Epermenia illigerella (Hübner, 1813)
Epermenia insecurella (Stainton, 1854)
Epermenia pontificella (Hübner, 1796)
Phaulernis dentella (Zeller, 1839)
Phaulernis fulviguttella (Zeller, 1839)

Erebidae
Amata phegea (Linnaeus, 1758)
Arctia caja (Linnaeus, 1758)
Arctia festiva (Hufnagel, 1766)
Arctia villica (Linnaeus, 1758)
Arctornis l-nigrum (Muller, 1764)
Atolmis rubricollis (Linnaeus, 1758)
Callimorpha dominula (Linnaeus, 1758)
Calliteara abietis (Denis & Schiffermüller, 1775)
Calliteara pudibunda (Linnaeus, 1758)
Catocala electa (Vieweg, 1790)
Catocala elocata (Esper, 1787)
Catocala fraxini (Linnaeus, 1758)
Catocala fulminea (Scopoli, 1763)
Catocala nupta (Linnaeus, 1767)
Catocala pacta (Linnaeus, 1758)
Catocala promissa (Denis & Schiffermüller, 1775)
Catocala sponsa (Linnaeus, 1767)
Colobochyla salicalis (Denis & Schiffermüller, 1775)
Coscinia cribraria (Linnaeus, 1758)
Coscinia striata (Linnaeus, 1758)
Cybosia mesomella (Linnaeus, 1758)
Diacrisia sannio (Linnaeus, 1758)
Diaphora mendica (Clerck, 1759)
Dicallomera fascelina (Linnaeus, 1758)
Eilema complana (Linnaeus, 1758)
Eilema depressa (Esper, 1787)
Eilema griseola (Hübner, 1803)
Eilema lurideola (Zincken, 1817)
Eilema lutarella (Linnaeus, 1758)
Eilema palliatella (Scopoli, 1763)
Eilema pygmaeola (Doubleday, 1847)
Eilema sororcula (Hufnagel, 1766)
Eublemma minutata (Fabricius, 1794)
Euclidia mi (Clerck, 1759)
Euclidia glyphica (Linnaeus, 1758)
Euplagia quadripunctaria (Poda, 1761)
Euproctis chrysorrhoea (Linnaeus, 1758)
Euproctis similis (Fuessly, 1775)
Grammodes stolida (Fabricius, 1775)
Gynaephora selenitica (Esper, 1789)
Herminia grisealis (Denis & Schiffermüller, 1775)
Herminia tarsicrinalis (Knoch, 1782)
Herminia tarsipennalis (Treitschke, 1835)
Hypena crassalis (Fabricius, 1787)
Hypena proboscidalis (Linnaeus, 1758)
Hypena rostralis (Linnaeus, 1758)
Hypenodes humidalis Doubleday, 1850
Hyphantria cunea (Drury, 1773)
Hyphoraia aulica (Linnaeus, 1758)
Laelia coenosa (Hübner, 1808)
Laspeyria flexula (Denis & Schiffermüller, 1775)
Leucoma salicis (Linnaeus, 1758)
Lithosia quadra (Linnaeus, 1758)
Lygephila pastinum (Treitschke, 1826)
Lygephila viciae (Hübner, 1822)
Lymantria dispar (Linnaeus, 1758)
Lymantria monacha (Linnaeus, 1758)
Macrochilo cribrumalis (Hübner, 1793)
Miltochrista miniata (Forster, 1771)
Nudaria mundana (Linnaeus, 1761)
Orgyia antiquoides (Hübner, 1822)
Orgyia recens (Hübner, 1819)
Orgyia antiqua (Linnaeus, 1758)
Paracolax tristalis (Fabricius, 1794)
Parascotia fuliginaria (Linnaeus, 1761)
Parasemia plantaginis (Linnaeus, 1758)
Pechipogo strigilata (Linnaeus, 1758)
Pelosia muscerda (Hufnagel, 1766)
Pelosia obtusa (Herrich-Schäffer, 1852)
Pericallia matronula (Linnaeus, 1758)
Phragmatobia fuliginosa (Linnaeus, 1758)
Phragmatobia luctifera (Denis & Schiffermüller, 1775)
Phytometra viridaria (Clerck, 1759)
Polypogon tentacularia (Linnaeus, 1758)
Rhyparia purpurata (Linnaeus, 1758)
Rivula sericealis (Scopoli, 1763)
Schrankia costaestrigalis (Stephens, 1834)
Schrankia taenialis (Hübner, 1809)
Scoliopteryx libatrix (Linnaeus, 1758)
Setina irrorella (Linnaeus, 1758)
Setina roscida (Denis & Schiffermüller, 1775)
Simplicia rectalis (Eversmann, 1842)
Spilosoma lubricipeda (Linnaeus, 1758)
Spilosoma lutea (Hufnagel, 1766)
Spilosoma urticae (Esper, 1789)
Thumatha senex (Hübner, 1808)
Trisateles emortualis (Denis & Schiffermüller, 1775)
Tyria jacobaeae (Linnaeus, 1758)
Utetheisa pulchella (Linnaeus, 1758)
Zanclognatha lunalis (Scopoli, 1763)

Eriocraniidae
Dyseriocrania subpurpurella (Haworth, 1828)
Eriocrania cicatricella (Zetterstedt, 1839)
Eriocrania semipurpurella (Stephens, 1835)
Eriocrania sparrmannella (Bosc, 1791)
Heringocrania unimaculella (Zetterstedt, 1839)

Gelechiidae
Acompsia cinerella (Clerck, 1759)
Altenia perspersella (Wocke, 1862)
Altenia scriptella (Hübner, 1796)
Anacampsis blattariella (Hübner, 1796)
Anacampsis populella (Clerck, 1759)
Anacampsis scintillella (Fischer von Röslerstamm, 1841)
Anacampsis temerella (Lienig & Zeller, 1846)
Anarsia lineatella Zeller, 1839
Aproaerema anthyllidella (Hübner, 1813)
Argolamprotes micella (Denis & Schiffermüller, 1775)
Aristotelia baltica A. Sulcs & I. Sulcs, 1983
Aristotelia brizella (Treitschke, 1833)
Aristotelia ericinella (Zeller, 1839)
Aristotelia subdecurtella (Stainton, 1859)
Aroga velocella (Duponchel, 1838)
Athrips mouffetella (Linnaeus, 1758)
Athrips pruinosella (Lienig & Zeller, 1846)
Brachmia blandella (Fabricius, 1798)
Brachmia dimidiella (Denis & Schiffermüller, 1775)
Bryotropha affinis (Haworth, 1828)
Bryotropha desertella (Douglas, 1850)
Bryotropha galbanella (Zeller, 1839)
Bryotropha plantariella (Tengstrom, 1848)
Bryotropha senectella (Zeller, 1839)
Bryotropha similis (Stainton, 1854)
Bryotropha terrella (Denis & Schiffermüller, 1775)
Bryotropha umbrosella (Zeller, 1839)
Carpatolechia alburnella (Zeller, 1839)
Carpatolechia fugitivella (Zeller, 1839)
Carpatolechia notatella (Hübner, 1813)
Carpatolechia proximella (Hübner, 1796)
Caryocolum cassella (Walker, 1864)
Caryocolum fischerella (Treitschke, 1833)
Caryocolum junctella (Douglas, 1851)
Caryocolum kroesmanniella (Herrich-Schäffer, 1854)
Caryocolum petryi (O. Hofmann, 1899)
Caryocolum schleichi (Christoph, 1872)
Caryocolum tischeriella (Zeller, 1839)
Caryocolum tricolorella (Haworth, 1812)
Caryocolum vicinella (Douglas, 1851)
Chionodes continuella (Zeller, 1839)
Chionodes distinctella (Zeller, 1839)
Chionodes electella (Zeller, 1839)
Chionodes fumatella (Douglas, 1850)
Chionodes lugubrella (Fabricius, 1794)
Chionodes tragicella (Heyden, 1865)
Chionodes viduella (Fabricius, 1794)
Chrysoesthia drurella (Fabricius, 1775)
Chrysoesthia sexguttella (Thunberg, 1794)
Cosmardia moritzella (Treitschke, 1835)
Dactylotula kinkerella (Snellen, 1876)
Dichomeris alacella (Zeller, 1839)
Dichomeris derasella (Denis & Schiffermüller, 1775)
Dichomeris juniperella (Linnaeus, 1761)
Dichomeris latipennella (Rebel, 1937)
Dichomeris limosellus (Schlager, 1849)
Dichomeris marginella (Fabricius, 1781)
Dichomeris ustalella (Fabricius, 1794)
Ephysteris inustella (Zeller, 1847)
Eulamprotes atrella (Denis & Schiffermüller, 1775)
Eulamprotes wilkella (Linnaeus, 1758)
Exoteleia dodecella (Linnaeus, 1758)
Filatima incomptella (Herrich-Schäffer, 1854)
Filatima ukrainica Piskunov, 1971
Gelechia jakovlevi Krulikovsky, 1905
Gelechia nigra (Haworth, 1828)
Gelechia rhombella (Denis & Schiffermüller, 1775)
Gelechia rhombelliformis Staudinger, 1871
Gelechia scotinella Herrich-Schäffer, 1854
Gelechia sestertiella Herrich-Schäffer, 1854
Gelechia sororculella (Hübner, 1817)
Gelechia turpella (Denis & Schiffermüller, 1775)
Gnorimoschema herbichii (Nowicki, 1864)
Helcystogramma lineolella (Zeller, 1839)
Helcystogramma lutatella (Herrich-Schäffer, 1854)
Helcystogramma rufescens (Haworth, 1828)
Hypatima rhomboidella (Linnaeus, 1758)
Isophrictis anthemidella (Wocke, 1871)
Isophrictis striatella (Denis & Schiffermüller, 1775)
Mesophleps silacella (Hübner, 1796)
Metzneria aprilella (Herrich-Schäffer, 1854)
Metzneria ehikeella Gozmany, 1954
Metzneria lappella (Linnaeus, 1758)
Metzneria metzneriella (Stainton, 1851)
Metzneria neuropterella (Zeller, 1839)
Metzneria paucipunctella (Zeller, 1839)
Metzneria santolinella (Amsel, 1936)
Monochroa cytisella (Curtis, 1837)
Monochroa elongella (Heinemann, 1870)
Monochroa ferrea (Frey, 1870)
Monochroa hornigi (Staudinger, 1883)
Monochroa inflexella Svensson, 1992
Monochroa lucidella (Stephens, 1834)
Monochroa lutulentella (Zeller, 1839)
Monochroa palustrellus (Douglas, 1850)
Monochroa sepicolella (Herrich-Schäffer, 1854)
Monochroa simplicella (Lienig & Zeller, 1846)
Monochroa suffusella (Douglas, 1850)
Monochroa tenebrella (Hübner, 1817)
Monochroa tetragonella (Stainton, 1885)
Neofaculta ericetella (Geyer, 1832)
Neofaculta infernella (Herrich-Schäffer, 1854)
Neofriseria peliella (Treitschke, 1835)
Parachronistis albiceps (Zeller, 1839)
Pexicopia malvella (Hübner, 1805)
Prolita sexpunctella (Fabricius, 1794)
Pseudotelphusa paripunctella (Thunberg, 1794)
Pseudotelphusa scalella (Scopoli, 1763)
Psoricoptera gibbosella (Zeller, 1839)
Ptocheuusa inopella (Zeller, 1839)
Recurvaria leucatella (Clerck, 1759)
Recurvaria nanella (Denis & Schiffermüller, 1775)
Scrobipalpa acuminatella (Sircom, 1850)
Scrobipalpa artemisiella (Treitschke, 1833)
Scrobipalpa atriplicella (Fischer von Röslerstamm, 1841)
Scrobipalpa murinella (Duponchel, 1843)
Scrobipalpa obsoletella (Fischer von Röslerstamm, 1841)
Scrobipalpula psilella (Herrich-Schäffer, 1854)
Sophronia chilonella (Treitschke, 1833)
Sophronia humerella (Denis & Schiffermüller, 1775)
Sophronia semicostella (Hübner, 1813)
Sophronia sicariellus (Zeller, 1839)
Stenolechia gemmella (Linnaeus, 1758)
Syncopacma albifrontella (Heinemann, 1870)
Syncopacma cinctella (Clerck, 1759)
Syncopacma taeniolella (Zeller, 1839)
Teleiodes flavimaculella (Herrich-Schäffer, 1854)
Teleiodes luculella (Hübner, 1813)
Teleiodes vulgella (Denis & Schiffermüller, 1775)
Teleiopsis diffinis (Haworth, 1828)
Thiotricha subocellea (Stephens, 1834)
Tuta absoluta (Meyrick, 1917)
Xystophora carchariella (Zeller, 1839)

Geometridae
Abraxas grossulariata (Linnaeus, 1758)
Abraxas sylvata (Scopoli, 1763)
Acasis viretata (Hübner, 1799)
Aethalura punctulata (Denis & Schiffermüller, 1775)
Agriopis aurantiaria (Hübner, 1799)
Agriopis leucophaearia (Denis & Schiffermüller, 1775)
Agriopis marginaria (Fabricius, 1776)
Alcis jubata (Thunberg, 1788)
Alcis repandata (Linnaeus, 1758)
Alsophila aescularia (Denis & Schiffermüller, 1775)
Angerona prunaria (Linnaeus, 1758)
Anticlea derivata (Denis & Schiffermüller, 1775)
Anticollix sparsata (Treitschke, 1828)
Apeira syringaria (Linnaeus, 1758)
Aplocera efformata (Guenee, 1858)
Aplocera plagiata (Linnaeus, 1758)
Aplocera praeformata (Hübner, 1826)
Apocheima hispidaria (Denis & Schiffermüller, 1775)
Archiearis parthenias (Linnaeus, 1761)
Arichanna melanaria (Linnaeus, 1758)
Artiora evonymaria (Denis & Schiffermüller, 1775)
Aspitates gilvaria (Denis & Schiffermüller, 1775)
Asthena albulata (Hufnagel, 1767)
Asthena anseraria (Herrich-Schäffer, 1855)
Baptria tibiale (Esper, 1791)
Biston betularia (Linnaeus, 1758)
Biston strataria (Hufnagel, 1767)
Boudinotiana notha (Hübner, 1803)
Bupalus piniaria (Linnaeus, 1758)
Cabera exanthemata (Scopoli, 1763)
Cabera leptographa Wehrli, 1936
Cabera pusaria (Linnaeus, 1758)
Campaea margaritaria (Linnaeus, 1761)
Camptogramma bilineata (Linnaeus, 1758)
Carsia sororiata (Hübner, 1813)
Catarhoe cuculata (Hufnagel, 1767)
Catarhoe rubidata (Denis & Schiffermüller, 1775)
Cepphis advenaria (Hübner, 1790)
Chariaspilates formosaria (Eversmann, 1837)
Charissa obscurata (Denis & Schiffermüller, 1775)
Charissa ambiguata (Duponchel, 1830)
Chesias legatella (Denis & Schiffermüller, 1775)
Chesias rufata (Fabricius, 1775)
Chiasmia clathrata (Linnaeus, 1758)
Chlorissa viridata (Linnaeus, 1758)
Chloroclysta miata (Linnaeus, 1758)
Chloroclysta siterata (Hufnagel, 1767)
Chloroclystis v-ata (Haworth, 1809)
Cleora cinctaria (Denis & Schiffermüller, 1775)
Cleorodes lichenaria (Hufnagel, 1767)
Colostygia pectinataria (Knoch, 1781)
Colotois pennaria (Linnaeus, 1761)
Comibaena bajularia (Denis & Schiffermüller, 1775)
Cosmorhoe ocellata (Linnaeus, 1758)
Costaconvexa polygrammata (Borkhausen, 1794)
Crocallis elinguaria (Linnaeus, 1758)
Cyclophora linearia (Hübner, 1799)
Cyclophora porata (Linnaeus, 1767)
Cyclophora punctaria (Linnaeus, 1758)
Cyclophora albipunctata (Hufnagel, 1767)
Cyclophora annularia (Fabricius, 1775)
Cyclophora pendularia (Clerck, 1759)
Cyclophora quercimontaria (Bastelberger, 1897)
Deileptenia ribeata (Clerck, 1759)
Dysstroma citrata (Linnaeus, 1761)
Dysstroma infuscata (Tengstrom, 1869)
Dysstroma truncata (Hufnagel, 1767)
Earophila badiata (Denis & Schiffermüller, 1775)
Ecliptopera capitata (Herrich-Schäffer, 1839)
Ecliptopera silaceata (Denis & Schiffermüller, 1775)
Ectropis crepuscularia (Denis & Schiffermüller, 1775)
Electrophaes corylata (Thunberg, 1792)
Ematurga atomaria (Linnaeus, 1758)
Ennomos alniaria (Linnaeus, 1758)
Ennomos autumnaria (Werneburg, 1859)
Ennomos erosaria (Denis & Schiffermüller, 1775)
Ennomos fuscantaria (Haworth, 1809)
Ennomos quercinaria (Hufnagel, 1767)
Epione repandaria (Hufnagel, 1767)
Epione vespertaria (Linnaeus, 1767)
Epirranthis diversata (Denis & Schiffermüller, 1775)
Epirrhoe alternata (Muller, 1764)
Epirrhoe galiata (Denis & Schiffermüller, 1775)
Epirrhoe hastulata (Hübner, 1790)
Epirrhoe rivata (Hübner, 1813)
Epirrhoe tartuensis Mols, 1965
Epirrhoe tristata (Linnaeus, 1758)
Epirrita autumnata (Borkhausen, 1794)
Epirrita christyi (Allen, 1906)
Epirrita dilutata (Denis & Schiffermüller, 1775)
Erannis defoliaria (Clerck, 1759)
Euchoeca nebulata (Scopoli, 1763)
Eulithis mellinata (Fabricius, 1787)
Eulithis populata (Linnaeus, 1758)
Eulithis prunata (Linnaeus, 1758)
Eulithis pyropata (Hübner, 1809)
Eulithis testata (Linnaeus, 1761)
Euphyia biangulata (Haworth, 1809)
Euphyia unangulata (Haworth, 1809)
Eupithecia abietaria (Goeze, 1781)
Eupithecia absinthiata (Clerck, 1759)
Eupithecia actaeata Walderdorff, 1869
Eupithecia analoga Djakonov, 1926
Eupithecia assimilata Doubleday, 1856
Eupithecia centaureata (Denis & Schiffermüller, 1775)
Eupithecia conterminata (Lienig, 1846)
Eupithecia denotata (Hübner, 1813)
Eupithecia distinctaria Herrich-Schäffer, 1848
Eupithecia dodoneata Guenee, 1858
Eupithecia egenaria Herrich-Schäffer, 1848
Eupithecia exiguata (Hübner, 1813)
Eupithecia extensaria (Freyer, 1844)
Eupithecia extraversaria Herrich-Schäffer, 1852
Eupithecia gelidata Moschler, 1860
Eupithecia icterata (de Villers, 1789)
Eupithecia immundata (Lienig, 1846)
Eupithecia indigata (Hübner, 1813)
Eupithecia innotata (Hufnagel, 1767)
Eupithecia insigniata (Hübner, 1790)
Eupithecia intricata (Zetterstedt, 1839)
Eupithecia inturbata (Hübner, 1817)
Eupithecia lanceata (Hübner, 1825)
Eupithecia lariciata (Freyer, 1841)
Eupithecia linariata (Denis & Schiffermüller, 1775)
Eupithecia millefoliata Rossler, 1866
Eupithecia nanata (Hübner, 1813)
Eupithecia ochridata Schutze & Pinker, 1968
Eupithecia pimpinellata (Hübner, 1813)
Eupithecia plumbeolata (Haworth, 1809)
Eupithecia pusillata (Denis & Schiffermüller, 1775)
Eupithecia pygmaeata (Hübner, 1799)
Eupithecia satyrata (Hübner, 1813)
Eupithecia selinata Herrich-Schäffer, 1861
Eupithecia simpliciata (Haworth, 1809)
Eupithecia sinuosaria (Eversmann, 1848)
Eupithecia subfuscata (Haworth, 1809)
Eupithecia subumbrata (Denis & Schiffermüller, 1775)
Eupithecia succenturiata (Linnaeus, 1758)
Eupithecia tantillaria Boisduval, 1840
Eupithecia tenuiata (Hübner, 1813)
Eupithecia thalictrata (Pungeler, 1902)
Eupithecia tripunctaria Herrich-Schäffer, 1852
Eupithecia trisignaria Herrich-Schäffer, 1848
Eupithecia valerianata (Hübner, 1813)
Eupithecia venosata (Fabricius, 1787)
Eupithecia virgaureata Doubleday, 1861
Eupithecia vulgata (Haworth, 1809)
Eustroma reticulata (Denis & Schiffermüller, 1775)
Gagitodes sagittata (Fabricius, 1787)
Gandaritis pyraliata (Denis & Schiffermüller, 1775)
Geometra papilionaria (Linnaeus, 1758)
Gymnoscelis rufifasciata (Haworth, 1809)
Heliomata glarearia (Denis & Schiffermüller, 1775)
Hemistola chrysoprasaria (Esper, 1795)
Hemithea aestivaria (Hübner, 1789)
Horisme aemulata (Hübner, 1813)
Horisme aquata (Hübner, 1813)
Horisme tersata (Denis & Schiffermüller, 1775)
Horisme vitalbata (Denis & Schiffermüller, 1775)
Hydrelia flammeolaria (Hufnagel, 1767)
Hydrelia sylvata (Denis & Schiffermüller, 1775)
Hydria cervinalis (Scopoli, 1763)
Hydria undulata (Linnaeus, 1758)
Hydriomena furcata (Thunberg, 1784)
Hydriomena impluviata (Denis & Schiffermüller, 1775)
Hydriomena ruberata (Freyer, 1831)
Hylaea fasciaria (Linnaeus, 1758)
Hypomecis punctinalis (Scopoli, 1763)
Hypomecis roboraria (Denis & Schiffermüller, 1775)
Hypoxystis pluviaria (Fabricius, 1787)
Idaea aversata (Linnaeus, 1758)
Idaea biselata (Hufnagel, 1767)
Idaea deversaria (Herrich-Schäffer, 1847)
Idaea dimidiata (Hufnagel, 1767)
Idaea emarginata (Linnaeus, 1758)
Idaea fuscovenosa (Goeze, 1781)
Idaea humiliata (Hufnagel, 1767)
Idaea muricata (Hufnagel, 1767)
Idaea pallidata (Denis & Schiffermüller, 1775)
Idaea seriata (Schrank, 1802)
Idaea serpentata (Hufnagel, 1767)
Idaea straminata (Borkhausen, 1794)
Idaea sylvestraria (Hübner, 1799)
Idaea trigeminata (Haworth, 1809)
Jodis lactearia (Linnaeus, 1758)
Jodis putata (Linnaeus, 1758)
Lampropteryx otregiata (Metcalfe, 1917)
Lampropteryx suffumata (Denis & Schiffermüller, 1775)
Larentia clavaria (Haworth, 1809)
Ligdia adustata (Denis & Schiffermüller, 1775)
Lithostege farinata (Hufnagel, 1767)
Lithostege griseata (Denis & Schiffermüller, 1775)
Lobophora halterata (Hufnagel, 1767)
Lomaspilis marginata (Linnaeus, 1758)
Lomaspilis opis Butler, 1878
Lomographa bimaculata (Fabricius, 1775)
Lomographa temerata (Denis & Schiffermüller, 1775)
Lycia hirtaria (Clerck, 1759)
Lycia pomonaria (Hübner, 1790)
Lythria cruentaria (Hufnagel, 1767)
Lythria purpuraria (Linnaeus, 1758)
Macaria alternata (Denis & Schiffermüller, 1775)
Macaria artesiaria (Denis & Schiffermüller, 1775)
Macaria brunneata (Thunberg, 1784)
Macaria carbonaria (Clerck, 1759)
Macaria liturata (Clerck, 1759)
Macaria loricaria (Eversmann, 1837)
Macaria notata (Linnaeus, 1758)
Macaria signaria (Hübner, 1809)
Macaria wauaria (Linnaeus, 1758)
Martania taeniata (Stephens, 1831)
Mesoleuca albicillata (Linnaeus, 1758)
Mesotype didymata (Linnaeus, 1758)
Mesotype parallelolineata (Retzius, 1783)
Narraga fasciolaria (Hufnagel, 1767)
Nycterosea obstipata (Fabricius, 1794)
Odezia atrata (Linnaeus, 1758)
Odontopera bidentata (Clerck, 1759)
Operophtera brumata (Linnaeus, 1758)
Operophtera fagata (Scharfenberg, 1805)
Opisthograptis luteolata (Linnaeus, 1758)
Orthonama vittata (Borkhausen, 1794)
Ourapteryx sambucaria (Linnaeus, 1758)
Paradarisa consonaria (Hübner, 1799)
Parectropis similaria (Hufnagel, 1767)
Pareulype berberata (Denis & Schiffermüller, 1775)
Pasiphila chloerata (Mabille, 1870)
Pasiphila debiliata (Hübner, 1817)
Pasiphila rectangulata (Linnaeus, 1758)
Pelurga comitata (Linnaeus, 1758)
Pennithera firmata (Hübner, 1822)
Perconia strigillaria (Hübner, 1787)
Peribatodes secundaria (Denis & Schiffermüller, 1775)
Perizoma affinitata (Stephens, 1831)
Perizoma albulata (Denis & Schiffermüller, 1775)
Perizoma alchemillata (Linnaeus, 1758)
Perizoma bifaciata (Haworth, 1809)
Perizoma blandiata (Denis & Schiffermüller, 1775)
Perizoma flavofasciata (Thunberg, 1792)
Perizoma hydrata (Treitschke, 1829)
Perizoma lugdunaria (Herrich-Schäffer, 1855)
Perizoma minorata (Treitschke, 1828)
Petrophora chlorosata (Scopoli, 1763)
Phibalapteryx virgata (Hufnagel, 1767)
Phigalia pilosaria (Denis & Schiffermüller, 1775)
Philereme transversata (Hufnagel, 1767)
Philereme vetulata (Denis & Schiffermüller, 1775)
Plagodis dolabraria (Linnaeus, 1767)
Plagodis pulveraria (Linnaeus, 1758)
Plemyria rubiginata (Denis & Schiffermüller, 1775)
Pseudopanthera macularia (Linnaeus, 1758)
Pseudoterpna pruinata (Hufnagel, 1767)
Pterapherapteryx sexalata (Retzius, 1783)
Rheumaptera hastata (Linnaeus, 1758)
Rheumaptera subhastata (Nolcken, 1870)
Rhodostrophia vibicaria (Clerck, 1759)
Scopula floslactata (Haworth, 1809)
Scopula immutata (Linnaeus, 1758)
Scopula incanata (Linnaeus, 1758)
Scopula marginepunctata (Goeze, 1781)
Scopula ternata Schrank, 1802
Scopula corrivalaria (Kretschmar, 1862)
Scopula decorata (Denis & Schiffermüller, 1775)
Scopula immorata (Linnaeus, 1758)
Scopula nemoraria (Hübner, 1799)
Scopula nigropunctata (Hufnagel, 1767)
Scopula ornata (Scopoli, 1763)
Scopula rubiginata (Hufnagel, 1767)
Scopula virgulata (Denis & Schiffermüller, 1775)
Scotopteryx bipunctaria (Denis & Schiffermüller, 1775)
Scotopteryx chenopodiata (Linnaeus, 1758)
Selenia dentaria (Fabricius, 1775)
Selenia lunularia (Hübner, 1788)
Selenia tetralunaria (Hufnagel, 1767)
Selidosema brunnearia (de Villers, 1789)
Siona lineata (Scopoli, 1763)
Spargania luctuata (Denis & Schiffermüller, 1775)
Stegania cararia (Hübner, 1790)
Thalera fimbrialis (Scopoli, 1763)
Thera cognata (Thunberg, 1792)
Thera juniperata (Linnaeus, 1758)
Thera obeliscata (Hübner, 1787)
Thera variata (Denis & Schiffermüller, 1775)
Thetidia smaragdaria (Fabricius, 1787)
Timandra comae Schmidt, 1931
Trichopteryx carpinata (Borkhausen, 1794)
Trichopteryx polycommata (Denis & Schiffermüller, 1775)
Triphosa dubitata (Linnaeus, 1758)
Venusia blomeri (Curtis, 1832)
Venusia cambrica Curtis, 1839
Xanthorhoe biriviata (Borkhausen, 1794)
Xanthorhoe designata (Hufnagel, 1767)
Xanthorhoe ferrugata (Clerck, 1759)
Xanthorhoe fluctuata (Linnaeus, 1758)
Xanthorhoe montanata (Denis & Schiffermüller, 1775)
Xanthorhoe quadrifasiata (Clerck, 1759)
Xanthorhoe spadicearia (Denis & Schiffermüller, 1775)

Glyphipterigidae
Acrolepia autumnitella Curtis, 1838
Acrolepiopsis assectella (Zeller, 1839)
Digitivalva arnicella (Heyden, 1863)
Digitivalva valeriella (Snellen, 1878)
Glyphipterix bergstraesserella (Fabricius, 1781)
Glyphipterix equitella (Scopoli, 1763)
Glyphipterix forsterella (Fabricius, 1781)
Glyphipterix haworthana (Stephens, 1834)
Glyphipterix simpliciella (Stephens, 1834)
Glyphipterix thrasonella (Scopoli, 1763)
Orthotelia sparganella (Thunberg, 1788)

Gracillariidae
Aspilapteryx tringipennella (Zeller, 1839)
Callisto denticulella (Thunberg, 1794)
Callisto insperatella (Nickerl, 1864)
Caloptilia alchimiella (Scopoli, 1763)
Caloptilia elongella (Linnaeus, 1761)
Caloptilia falconipennella (Hübner, 1813)
Caloptilia hemidactylella (Denis & Schiffermüller, 1775)
Caloptilia populetorum (Zeller, 1839)
Caloptilia robustella Jackh, 1972
Caloptilia roscipennella (Hübner, 1796)
Caloptilia rufipennella (Hübner, 1796)
Caloptilia stigmatella (Fabricius, 1781)
Calybites phasianipennella (Hübner, 1813)
Euspilapteryx auroguttella Stephens, 1835
Gracillaria syringella (Fabricius, 1794)
Parectopa ononidis (Zeller, 1839)
Parornix anglicella (Stainton, 1850)
Parornix betulae (Stainton, 1854)
Parornix devoniella (Stainton, 1850)
Parornix scoticella (Stainton, 1850)
Phyllocnistis labyrinthella (Bjerkander, 1790)
Phyllocnistis saligna (Zeller, 1839)
Phyllocnistis unipunctella (Stephens, 1834)
Phyllonorycter agilella (Zeller, 1846)
Phyllonorycter apparella (Herrich-Schäffer, 1855)
Phyllonorycter blancardella (Fabricius, 1781)
Phyllonorycter cavella (Zeller, 1846)
Phyllonorycter cerasicolella (Herrich-Schäffer, 1855)
Phyllonorycter comparella (Duponchel, 1843)
Phyllonorycter connexella (Zeller, 1846)
Phyllonorycter coryli (Nicelli, 1851)
Phyllonorycter corylifoliella (Hübner, 1796)
Phyllonorycter dubitella (Herrich-Schäffer, 1855)
Phyllonorycter emberizaepenella (Bouche, 1834)
Phyllonorycter esperella (Goeze, 1783)
Phyllonorycter froelichiella (Zeller, 1839)
Phyllonorycter geniculella (Ragonot, 1874)
Phyllonorycter harrisella (Linnaeus, 1761)
Phyllonorycter heegeriella (Zeller, 1846)
Phyllonorycter hilarella (Zetterstedt, 1839)
Phyllonorycter insignitella (Zeller, 1846)
Phyllonorycter issikii (Kumata, 1963)
Phyllonorycter joannisi (Le Marchand, 1936)
Phyllonorycter junoniella (Zeller, 1846)
Phyllonorycter klemannella (Fabricius, 1781)
Phyllonorycter lautella (Zeller, 1846)
Phyllonorycter maestingella (Muller, 1764)
Phyllonorycter muelleriella (Zeller, 1839)
Phyllonorycter nicellii (Stainton, 1851)
Phyllonorycter nigrescentella (Logan, 1851)
Phyllonorycter oxyacanthae (Frey, 1856)
Phyllonorycter pastorella (Zeller, 1846)
Phyllonorycter populifoliella (Treitschke, 1833)
Phyllonorycter quercifoliella (Zeller, 1839)
Phyllonorycter quinqueguttella (Stainton, 1851)
Phyllonorycter rajella (Linnaeus, 1758)
Phyllonorycter roboris (Zeller, 1839)
Phyllonorycter sagitella (Bjerkander, 1790)
Phyllonorycter salicicolella (Sircom, 1848)
Phyllonorycter salictella (Zeller, 1846)
Phyllonorycter schreberella (Fabricius, 1781)
Phyllonorycter sorbi (Frey, 1855)
Phyllonorycter spinicolella (Zeller, 1846)
Phyllonorycter stettinensis (Nicelli, 1852)
Phyllonorycter strigulatella (Lienig & Zeller, 1846)
Phyllonorycter tenerella (de Joannis, 1915)
Phyllonorycter tristrigella (Haworth, 1828)
Phyllonorycter ulmifoliella (Hübner, 1817)
Phyllonorycter viminetorum (Stainton, 1854)

Heliozelidae
Antispila metallella (Denis & Schiffermüller, 1775)
Heliozela hammoniella Sorhagen, 1885
Heliozela sericiella (Haworth, 1828)

Hepialidae
Hepialus humuli (Linnaeus, 1758)
Pharmacis fusconebulosa (DeGeer, 1778)
Pharmacis lupulina (Linnaeus, 1758)
Phymatopus hecta (Linnaeus, 1758)
Triodia sylvina (Linnaeus, 1761)

Incurvariidae
Incurvaria pectinea Haworth, 1828
Incurvaria praelatella (Denis & Schiffermüller, 1775)
Phylloporia bistrigella (Haworth, 1828)

Lasiocampidae
Cosmotriche lobulina (Denis & Schiffermüller, 1775)
Dendrolimus pini (Linnaeus, 1758)
Eriogaster lanestris (Linnaeus, 1758)
Euthrix potatoria (Linnaeus, 1758)
Gastropacha quercifolia (Linnaeus, 1758)
Gastropacha populifolia (Denis & Schiffermüller, 1775)
Lasiocampa quercus (Linnaeus, 1758)
Lasiocampa trifolii (Denis & Schiffermüller, 1775)
Macrothylacia rubi (Linnaeus, 1758)
Malacosoma castrensis (Linnaeus, 1758)
Malacosoma neustria (Linnaeus, 1758)
Odonestis pruni (Linnaeus, 1758)
Phyllodesma ilicifolia (Linnaeus, 1758)
Phyllodesma japonica (Leech, 1889)
Poecilocampa populi (Linnaeus, 1758)
Trichiura crataegi (Linnaeus, 1758)

Limacodidae
Apoda limacodes (Hufnagel, 1766)
Heterogenea asella (Denis & Schiffermüller, 1775)

Lyonetiidae
Leucoptera lustratella (Herrich-Schäffer, 1855)
Leucoptera malifoliella (O. Costa, 1836)
Leucoptera sinuella (Reutti, 1853)
Lyonetia clerkella (Linnaeus, 1758)
Lyonetia ledi Wocke, 1859
Lyonetia prunifoliella (Hübner, 1796)

Lypusidae
Amphisbatis incongruella (Stainton, 1849)
Lypusa maurella (Denis & Schiffermüller, 1775)
Pseudatemelia flavifrontella (Denis & Schiffermüller, 1775)
Pseudatemelia elsae Svensson, 1982
Pseudatemelia josephinae (Toll, 1956)

Micropterigidae
Micropterix aruncella (Scopoli, 1763)
Micropterix aureatella (Scopoli, 1763)
Micropterix calthella (Linnaeus, 1761)
Micropterix mansuetella Zeller, 1844
Micropterix tunbergella (Fabricius, 1787)

Momphidae
Mompha langiella (Hübner, 1796)
Mompha idaei (Zeller, 1839)
Mompha conturbatella (Hübner, 1819)
Mompha divisella Herrich-Schäffer, 1854
Mompha epilobiella (Denis & Schiffermüller, 1775)
Mompha sturnipennella (Treitschke, 1833)
Mompha subbistrigella (Haworth, 1828)
Mompha locupletella (Denis & Schiffermüller, 1775)
Mompha raschkiella (Zeller, 1839)
Mompha terminella (Humphreys & Westwood, 1845)

Nepticulidae
Bohemannia pulverosella (Stainton, 1849)
Ectoedemia albifasciella (Heinemann, 1871)
Ectoedemia arcuatella (Herrich-Schäffer, 1855)
Ectoedemia argyropeza (Zeller, 1839)
Ectoedemia atricollis (Stainton, 1857)
Ectoedemia hannoverella (Glitz, 1872)
Ectoedemia intimella (Zeller, 1848)
Ectoedemia klimeschi (Skala, 1933)
Ectoedemia minimella (Zetterstedt, 1839)
Ectoedemia occultella (Linnaeus, 1767)
Ectoedemia rubivora (Wocke, 1860)
Ectoedemia turbidella (Zeller, 1848)
Ectoedemia sericopeza (Zeller, 1839)
Ectoedemia septembrella (Stainton, 1849)
Ectoedemia weaveri (Stainton, 1855)
Ectoedemia atrifrontella (Stainton, 1851)
Enteucha acetosae (Stainton, 1854)
Stigmella aceris (Frey, 1857)
Stigmella aeneofasciella (Herrich-Schäffer, 1855)
Stigmella alnetella (Stainton, 1856)
Stigmella anomalella (Goeze, 1783)
Stigmella assimilella (Zeller, 1848)
Stigmella atricapitella (Haworth, 1828)
Stigmella aurella (Fabricius, 1775)
Stigmella basiguttella (Heinemann, 1862)
Stigmella benanderella (Wolff, 1955)
Stigmella betulicola (Stainton, 1856)
Stigmella carpinella (Heinemann, 1862)
Stigmella catharticella (Stainton, 1853)
Stigmella confusella (Wood & Walsingham, 1894)
Stigmella continuella (Stainton, 1856)
Stigmella crataegella (Klimesch, 1936)
Stigmella desperatella (Frey, 1856)
Stigmella filipendulae (Wocke, 1871)
Stigmella floslactella (Haworth, 1828)
Stigmella freyella (Heyden, 1858)
Stigmella glutinosae (Stainton, 1858)
Stigmella hemargyrella (Kollar, 1832)
Stigmella hybnerella (Hübner, 1796)
Stigmella incognitella (Herrich-Schäffer, 1855)
Stigmella lapponica (Wocke, 1862)
Stigmella lediella (Schleich, 1867)
Stigmella lemniscella (Zeller, 1839)
Stigmella lonicerarum (Frey, 1856)
Stigmella luteella (Stainton, 1857)
Stigmella magdalenae (Klimesch, 1950)
Stigmella malella (Stainton, 1854)
Stigmella microtheriella (Stainton, 1854)
Stigmella minusculella (Herrich-Schäffer, 1855)
Stigmella myrtillella (Stainton, 1857)
Stigmella nivenburgensis (Preissecker, 1942)
Stigmella nylandriella (Tengstrom, 1848)
Stigmella obliquella (Heinemann, 1862)
Stigmella oxyacanthella (Stainton, 1854)
Stigmella plagicolella (Stainton, 1854)
Stigmella poterii (Stainton, 1857)
Stigmella pretiosa (Heinemann, 1862)
Stigmella prunetorum (Stainton, 1855)
Stigmella pyri (Glitz, 1865)
Stigmella roborella (Johansson, 1971)
Stigmella ruficapitella (Haworth, 1828)
Stigmella salicis (Stainton, 1854)
Stigmella samiatella (Zeller, 1839)
Stigmella sorbi (Stainton, 1861)
Stigmella splendidissimella (Herrich-Schäffer, 1855)
Stigmella stettinensis (Heinemann, 1871)
Stigmella tiliae (Frey, 1856)
Stigmella tityrella (Stainton, 1854)
Stigmella trimaculella (Haworth, 1828)
Stigmella ulmivora (Fologne, 1860)
Stigmella viscerella (Stainton, 1853)
Stigmella zelleriella (Snellen, 1875)
Trifurcula headleyella (Stainton, 1854)

Noctuidae
Abrostola asclepiadis (Denis & Schiffermüller, 1775)
Abrostola tripartita (Hufnagel, 1766)
Abrostola triplasia (Linnaeus, 1758)
Acontia trabealis (Scopoli, 1763)
Acronicta aceris (Linnaeus, 1758)
Acronicta leporina (Linnaeus, 1758)
Acronicta strigosa (Denis & Schiffermüller, 1775)
Acronicta alni (Linnaeus, 1767)
Acronicta cuspis (Hübner, 1813)
Acronicta psi (Linnaeus, 1758)
Acronicta tridens (Denis & Schiffermüller, 1775)
Acronicta auricoma (Denis & Schiffermüller, 1775)
Acronicta cinerea (Hufnagel, 1766)
Acronicta euphorbiae (Denis & Schiffermüller, 1775)
Acronicta menyanthidis (Esper, 1789)
Acronicta rumicis (Linnaeus, 1758)
Actebia fennica (Tauscher, 1837)
Actebia praecox (Linnaeus, 1758)
Actinotia polyodon (Clerck, 1759)
Agrochola helvola (Linnaeus, 1758)
Agrochola litura (Linnaeus, 1758)
Agrochola lota (Clerck, 1759)
Agrochola macilenta (Hübner, 1809)
Agrochola circellaris (Hufnagel, 1766)
Agrotis cinerea (Denis & Schiffermüller, 1775)
Agrotis clavis (Hufnagel, 1766)
Agrotis exclamationis (Linnaeus, 1758)
Agrotis ipsilon (Hufnagel, 1766)
Agrotis ripae Hübner, 1823
Agrotis segetum (Denis & Schiffermüller, 1775)
Agrotis vestigialis (Hufnagel, 1766)
Allophyes oxyacanthae (Linnaeus, 1758)
Ammoconia caecimacula (Denis & Schiffermüller, 1775)
Amphipoea fucosa (Freyer, 1830)
Amphipoea lucens (Freyer, 1845)
Amphipoea oculea (Linnaeus, 1761)
Amphipyra berbera Rungs, 1949
Amphipyra livida (Denis & Schiffermüller, 1775)
Amphipyra perflua (Fabricius, 1787)
Amphipyra pyramidea (Linnaeus, 1758)
Amphipyra tragopoginis (Clerck, 1759)
Anaplectoides prasina (Denis & Schiffermüller, 1775)
Anarta myrtilli (Linnaeus, 1761)
Anarta trifolii (Hufnagel, 1766)
Anorthoa munda (Denis & Schiffermüller, 1775)
Antitype chi (Linnaeus, 1758)
Apamea anceps (Denis & Schiffermüller, 1775)
Apamea crenata (Hufnagel, 1766)
Apamea epomidion (Haworth, 1809)
Apamea furva (Denis & Schiffermüller, 1775)
Apamea illyria Freyer, 1846
Apamea lateritia (Hufnagel, 1766)
Apamea lithoxylaea (Denis & Schiffermüller, 1775)
Apamea monoglypha (Hufnagel, 1766)
Apamea oblonga (Haworth, 1809)
Apamea remissa (Hübner, 1809)
Apamea rubrirena (Treitschke, 1825)
Apamea scolopacina (Esper, 1788)
Apamea sordens (Hufnagel, 1766)
Apamea sublustris (Esper, 1788)
Apamea unanimis (Hübner, 1813)
Aporophyla lueneburgensis (Freyer, 1848)
Apterogenum ypsillon (Denis & Schiffermüller, 1775)
Archanara dissoluta (Treitschke, 1825)
Asteroscopus sphinx (Hufnagel, 1766)
Athetis pallustris (Hübner, 1808)
Autographa bractea (Denis & Schiffermüller, 1775)
Autographa buraetica (Staudinger, 1892)
Autographa excelsa (Kretschmar, 1862)
Autographa gamma (Linnaeus, 1758)
Autographa jota (Linnaeus, 1758)
Autographa mandarina (Freyer, 1845)
Autographa pulchrina (Haworth, 1809)
Axylia putris (Linnaeus, 1761)
Blepharita amica (Treitschke, 1825)
Brachionycha nubeculosa (Esper, 1785)
Brachylomia viminalis (Fabricius, 1776)
Bryophila ereptricula Treitschke, 1825
Bryophila raptricula (Denis & Schiffermüller, 1775)
Calamia tridens (Hufnagel, 1766)
Callopistria juventina (Stoll, 1782)
Calophasia lunula (Hufnagel, 1766)
Caradrina morpheus (Hufnagel, 1766)
Caradrina clavipalpis Scopoli, 1763
Caradrina selini Boisduval, 1840
Celaena haworthii (Curtis, 1829)
Ceramica pisi (Linnaeus, 1758)
Cerapteryx graminis (Linnaeus, 1758)
Cerastis leucographa (Denis & Schiffermüller, 1775)
Cerastis rubricosa (Denis & Schiffermüller, 1775)
Charanyca trigrammica (Hufnagel, 1766)
Charanyca ferruginea (Esper, 1785)
Chersotis cuprea (Denis & Schiffermüller, 1775)
Chilodes maritima (Tauscher, 1806)
Chloantha hyperici (Denis & Schiffermüller, 1775)
Coenophila subrosea (Stephens, 1829)
Colocasia coryli (Linnaeus, 1758)
Conisania leineri (Freyer, 1836)
Conisania luteago (Denis & Schiffermüller, 1775)
Conistra rubiginosa (Scopoli, 1763)
Conistra vaccinii (Linnaeus, 1761)
Conistra rubiginea (Denis & Schiffermüller, 1775)
Coranarta cordigera (Thunberg, 1788)
Cosmia trapezina (Linnaeus, 1758)
Cosmia diffinis (Linnaeus, 1767)
Cosmia pyralina (Denis & Schiffermüller, 1775)
Cosmia affinis (Linnaeus, 1767)
Craniophora ligustri (Denis & Schiffermüller, 1775)
Cryphia fraudatricula (Hübner, 1803)
Cryphia algae (Fabricius, 1775)
Crypsedra gemmea (Treitschke, 1825)
Cryptocala chardinyi (Boisduval, 1829)
Cucullia absinthii (Linnaeus, 1761)
Cucullia argentea (Hufnagel, 1766)
Cucullia artemisiae (Hufnagel, 1766)
Cucullia asteris (Denis & Schiffermüller, 1775)
Cucullia balsamitae Boisduval, 1840
Cucullia chamomillae (Denis & Schiffermüller, 1775)
Cucullia fraudatrix Eversmann, 1837
Cucullia gnaphalii (Hübner, 1813)
Cucullia lactucae (Denis & Schiffermüller, 1775)
Cucullia praecana Eversmann, 1843
Cucullia tanaceti (Denis & Schiffermüller, 1775)
Cucullia umbratica (Linnaeus, 1758)
Cucullia lychnitis Rambur, 1833
Deltote bankiana (Fabricius, 1775)
Deltote uncula (Clerck, 1759)
Deltote pygarga (Hufnagel, 1766)
Denticucullus pygmina (Haworth, 1809)
Diachrysia chrysitis (Linnaeus, 1758)
Diachrysia stenochrysis (Warren, 1913)
Diachrysia zosimi (Hübner, 1822)
Diarsia brunnea (Denis & Schiffermüller, 1775)
Diarsia dahlii (Hübner, 1813)
Diarsia mendica (Fabricius, 1775)
Diarsia rubi (Vieweg, 1790)
Dichagyris signifera (Denis & Schiffermüller, 1775)
Dicycla oo (Linnaeus, 1758)
Diloba caeruleocephala (Linnaeus, 1758)
Dypterygia scabriuscula (Linnaeus, 1758)
Egira conspicillaris (Linnaeus, 1758)
Elaphria venustula (Hübner, 1790)
Enargia paleacea (Esper, 1788)
Eremobia ochroleuca (Denis & Schiffermüller, 1775)
Eucarta virgo (Treitschke, 1835)
Euchalcia modestoides Poole, 1989
Eugraphe sigma (Denis & Schiffermüller, 1775)
Euplexia lucipara (Linnaeus, 1758)
Eupsilia transversa (Hufnagel, 1766)
Eurois occulta (Linnaeus, 1758)
Euxoa cursoria (Hufnagel, 1766)
Euxoa nigricans (Linnaeus, 1761)
Euxoa nigrofusca (Esper, 1788)
Euxoa obelisca (Denis & Schiffermüller, 1775)
Euxoa recussa (Hübner, 1817)
Euxoa vitta (Esper, 1789)
Fabula zollikoferi (Freyer, 1836)
Globia algae (Esper, 1789)
Globia sparganii (Esper, 1790)
Gortyna flavago (Denis & Schiffermüller, 1775)
Graphiphora augur (Fabricius, 1775)
Griposia aprilina (Linnaeus, 1758)
Hada plebeja (Linnaeus, 1761)
Hadena irregularis (Hufnagel, 1766)
Hadena perplexa (Denis & Schiffermüller, 1775)
Hadena albimacula (Borkhausen, 1792)
Hadena capsincola (Denis & Schiffermüller, 1775)
Hadena compta (Denis & Schiffermüller, 1775)
Hadena confusa (Hufnagel, 1766)
Hadena filograna (Esper, 1788)
Hecatera bicolorata (Hufnagel, 1766)
Hecatera dysodea (Denis & Schiffermüller, 1775)
Helicoverpa armigera (Hübner, 1808)
Heliothis adaucta Butler, 1878
Heliothis maritima Graslin, 1855
Heliothis ononis (Denis & Schiffermüller, 1775)
Heliothis peltigera (Denis & Schiffermüller, 1775)
Heliothis viriplaca (Hufnagel, 1766)
Helotropha leucostigma (Hübner, 1808)
Hoplodrina ambigua (Denis & Schiffermüller, 1775)
Hoplodrina blanda (Denis & Schiffermüller, 1775)
Hoplodrina octogenaria (Goeze, 1781)
Hoplodrina respersa (Denis & Schiffermüller, 1775)
Hydraecia micacea (Esper, 1789)
Hydraecia petasitis Doubleday, 1847
Hydraecia ultima Holst, 1965
Hyppa rectilinea (Esper, 1788)
Hyssia cavernosa (Eversmann, 1842)
Ipimorpha contusa (Freyer, 1849)
Ipimorpha retusa (Linnaeus, 1761)
Ipimorpha subtusa (Denis & Schiffermüller, 1775)
Lacanobia contigua (Denis & Schiffermüller, 1775)
Lacanobia suasa (Denis & Schiffermüller, 1775)
Lacanobia thalassina (Hufnagel, 1766)
Lacanobia aliena (Hübner, 1809)
Lacanobia oleracea (Linnaeus, 1758)
Lacanobia splendens (Hübner, 1808)
Lacanobia w-latinum (Hufnagel, 1766)
Lamprotes c-aureum (Knoch, 1781)
Lasionycta imbecilla (Fabricius, 1794)
Lasionycta proxima (Hübner, 1809)
Lateroligia ophiogramma (Esper, 1794)
Lenisa geminipuncta (Haworth, 1809)
Leucania comma (Linnaeus, 1761)
Leucania obsoleta (Hübner, 1803)
Lithophane consocia (Borkhausen, 1792)
Lithophane furcifera (Hufnagel, 1766)
Lithophane lamda (Fabricius, 1787)
Lithophane ornitopus (Hufnagel, 1766)
Lithophane socia (Hufnagel, 1766)
Litoligia literosa (Haworth, 1809)
Longalatedes elymi (Treitschke, 1825)
Luperina testacea (Denis & Schiffermüller, 1775)
Lycophotia porphyrea (Denis & Schiffermüller, 1775)
Macdunnoughia confusa (Stephens, 1850)
Mamestra brassicae (Linnaeus, 1758)
Melanchra persicariae (Linnaeus, 1761)
Mesapamea secalella Remm, 1983
Mesapamea secalis (Linnaeus, 1758)
Mesogona oxalina (Hübner, 1803)
Mesoligia furuncula (Denis & Schiffermüller, 1775)
Mniotype adusta (Esper, 1790)
Mniotype bathensis (Lutzau, 1901)
Mniotype satura (Denis & Schiffermüller, 1775)
Moma alpium (Osbeck, 1778)
Mythimna albipuncta (Denis & Schiffermüller, 1775)
Mythimna ferrago (Fabricius, 1787)
Mythimna conigera (Denis & Schiffermüller, 1775)
Mythimna impura (Hübner, 1808)
Mythimna pallens (Linnaeus, 1758)
Mythimna pudorina (Denis & Schiffermüller, 1775)
Mythimna straminea (Treitschke, 1825)
Mythimna turca (Linnaeus, 1761)
Naenia typica (Linnaeus, 1758)
Noctua comes Hübner, 1813
Noctua fimbriata (Schreber, 1759)
Noctua interjecta Hübner, 1803
Noctua interposita (Hübner, 1790)
Noctua janthe (Borkhausen, 1792)
Noctua janthina Denis & Schiffermüller, 1775
Noctua orbona (Hufnagel, 1766)
Noctua pronuba (Linnaeus, 1758)
Nonagria typhae (Thunberg, 1784)
Ochropleura plecta (Linnaeus, 1761)
Oligia fasciuncula (Haworth, 1809)
Oligia latruncula (Denis & Schiffermüller, 1775)
Oligia strigilis (Linnaeus, 1758)
Oligia versicolor (Borkhausen, 1792)
Opigena polygona (Denis & Schiffermüller, 1775)
Orthosia gracilis (Denis & Schiffermüller, 1775)
Orthosia opima (Hübner, 1809)
Orthosia cerasi (Fabricius, 1775)
Orthosia cruda (Denis & Schiffermüller, 1775)
Orthosia miniosa (Denis & Schiffermüller, 1775)
Orthosia populeti (Fabricius, 1775)
Orthosia incerta (Hufnagel, 1766)
Orthosia gothica (Linnaeus, 1758)
Pachetra sagittigera (Hufnagel, 1766)
Panemeria tenebrata (Scopoli, 1763)
Panolis flammea (Denis & Schiffermüller, 1775)
Panthea coenobita (Esper, 1785)
Papestra biren (Goeze, 1781)
Paradiarsia punicea (Hübner, 1803)
Parastichtis suspecta (Hübner, 1817)
Peridroma saucia (Hübner, 1808)
Periphanes delphinii (Linnaeus, 1758)
Phlogophora meticulosa (Linnaeus, 1758)
Photedes extrema (Hübner, 1809)
Photedes fluxa (Hübner, 1809)
Photedes minima (Haworth, 1809)
Phragmatiphila nexa (Hübner, 1808)
Plusia festucae (Linnaeus, 1758)
Plusia putnami (Grote, 1873)
Plusidia cheiranthi (Tauscher, 1809)
Polia bombycina (Hufnagel, 1766)
Polia hepatica (Clerck, 1759)
Polychrysia moneta (Fabricius, 1787)
Polymixis polymita (Linnaeus, 1761)
Protarchanara brevilinea (Fenn, 1864)
Protolampra sobrina (Duponchel, 1843)
Protoschinia scutosa (Denis & Schiffermüller, 1775)
Pseudeustrotia candidula (Denis & Schiffermüller, 1775)
Pyrrhia umbra (Hufnagel, 1766)
Rhizedra lutosa (Hübner, 1803)
Rhyacia simulans (Hufnagel, 1766)
Sedina buettneri (E. Hering, 1858)
Senta flammea (Curtis, 1828)
Sideridis rivularis (Fabricius, 1775)
Sideridis kitti (Schawerda, 1914)
Sideridis reticulata (Goeze, 1781)
Sideridis turbida (Esper, 1790)
Simyra albovenosa (Goeze, 1781)
Simyra nervosa (Denis & Schiffermüller, 1775)
Spaelotis ravida (Denis & Schiffermüller, 1775)
Spaelotis suecica (Aurivillius, 1890)
Spodoptera exigua (Hübner, 1808)
Staurophora celsia (Linnaeus, 1758)
Subacronicta megacephala (Denis & Schiffermüller, 1775)
Syngrapha interrogationis (Linnaeus, 1758)
Syngrapha microgamma (Hübner, 1823)
Thalpophila matura (Hufnagel, 1766)
Tholera cespitis (Denis & Schiffermüller, 1775)
Tholera decimalis (Poda, 1761)
Tiliacea aurago (Denis & Schiffermüller, 1775)
Tiliacea citrago (Linnaeus, 1758)
Trachea atriplicis (Linnaeus, 1758)
Trichosea ludifica (Linnaeus, 1758)
Tyta luctuosa (Denis & Schiffermüller, 1775)
Victrix umovii (Eversmann, 1846)
Xanthia gilvago (Denis & Schiffermüller, 1775)
Xanthia icteritia (Hufnagel, 1766)
Xanthia togata (Esper, 1788)
Xestia ashworthii (Doubleday, 1855)
Xestia c-nigrum (Linnaeus, 1758)
Xestia ditrapezium (Denis & Schiffermüller, 1775)
Xestia triangulum (Hufnagel, 1766)
Xestia alpicola (Zetterstedt, 1839)
Xestia sincera (Herrich-Schäffer, 1851)
Xestia speciosa (Hübner, 1813)
Xestia baja (Denis & Schiffermüller, 1775)
Xestia castanea (Esper, 1798)
Xestia sexstrigata (Haworth, 1809)
Xestia stigmatica (Hübner, 1813)
Xestia xanthographa (Denis & Schiffermüller, 1775)
Xylena solidaginis (Hübner, 1803)
Xylena exsoleta (Linnaeus, 1758)
Xylena vetusta (Hübner, 1813)

Nolidae
Bena bicolorana (Fuessly, 1775)
Earias clorana (Linnaeus, 1761)
Earias vernana (Fabricius, 1787)
Meganola albula (Denis & Schiffermüller, 1775)
Meganola strigula (Denis & Schiffermüller, 1775)
Meganola togatulalis (Hübner, 1796)
Nola aerugula (Hübner, 1793)
Nola confusalis (Herrich-Schäffer, 1847)
Nola cucullatella (Linnaeus, 1758)
Nycteola asiatica (Krulikovsky, 1904)
Nycteola degenerana (Hübner, 1799)
Nycteola revayana (Scopoli, 1772)
Nycteola svecicus (Bryk, 1941)
Pseudoips prasinana (Linnaeus, 1758)

Notodontidae
Cerura erminea (Esper, 1783)
Cerura vinula (Linnaeus, 1758)
Clostera anachoreta (Denis & Schiffermüller, 1775)
Clostera anastomosis (Linnaeus, 1758)
Clostera curtula (Linnaeus, 1758)
Clostera pigra (Hufnagel, 1766)
Drymonia dodonaea (Denis & Schiffermüller, 1775)
Drymonia ruficornis (Hufnagel, 1766)
Furcula bicuspis (Borkhausen, 1790)
Furcula bifida (Brahm, 1787)
Furcula furcula (Clerck, 1759)
Gluphisia crenata (Esper, 1785)
Harpyia milhauseri (Fabricius, 1775)
Leucodonta bicoloria (Denis & Schiffermüller, 1775)
Notodonta dromedarius (Linnaeus, 1767)
Notodonta torva (Hübner, 1803)
Notodonta tritophus (Denis & Schiffermüller, 1775)
Notodonta ziczac (Linnaeus, 1758)
Odontosia carmelita (Esper, 1799)
Odontosia sieversii (Menetries, 1856)
Peridea anceps (Goeze, 1781)
Phalera bucephala (Linnaeus, 1758)
Pheosia gnoma (Fabricius, 1776)
Pheosia tremula (Clerck, 1759)
Pterostoma palpina (Clerck, 1759)
Ptilodon capucina (Linnaeus, 1758)
Ptilodon cucullina (Denis & Schiffermüller, 1775)
Ptilophora plumigera (Denis & Schiffermüller, 1775)
Pygaera timon (Hübner, 1803)
Stauropus fagi (Linnaeus, 1758)
Thaumetopoea pinivora (Treitschke, 1834)

Oecophoridae
Bisigna procerella (Denis & Schiffermüller, 1775)
Borkhausenia fuscescens (Haworth, 1828)
Borkhausenia luridicomella (Herrich-Schäffer, 1856)
Borkhausenia minutella (Linnaeus, 1758)
Crassa tinctella (Hübner, 1796)
Crassa unitella (Hübner, 1796)
Denisia luticiliella (Erschoff, 1877)
Denisia similella (Hübner, 1796)
Denisia stipella (Linnaeus, 1758)
Denisia stroemella (Fabricius, 1779)
Deuterogonia pudorina (Wocke, 1857)
Endrosis sarcitrella (Linnaeus, 1758)
Epicallima formosella (Denis & Schiffermüller, 1775)
Harpella forficella (Scopoli, 1763)
Hofmannophila pseudospretella (Stainton, 1849)
Metalampra cinnamomea (Zeller, 1839)
Pleurota bicostella (Clerck, 1759)
Schiffermuelleria schaefferella (Linnaeus, 1758)

Opostegidae
Opostega salaciella (Treitschke, 1833)
Pseudopostega auritella (Hübner, 1813)
Pseudopostega crepusculella (Zeller, 1839)

Plutellidae
Eidophasia messingiella (Fischer von Röslerstamm, 1840)
Plutella xylostella (Linnaeus, 1758)
Plutella porrectella (Linnaeus, 1758)
Rhigognostis incarnatella (Steudel, 1873)

Praydidae
Atemelia torquatella (Lienig & Zeller, 1846)
Prays fraxinella (Bjerkander, 1784)
Prays ruficeps (Heinemann, 1854)

Prodoxidae
Lampronia capitella (Clerck, 1759)
Lampronia corticella (Linnaeus, 1758)
Lampronia flavimitrella (Hübner, 1817)
Lampronia fuscatella (Tengstrom, 1848)
Lampronia luzella (Hübner, 1817)
Lampronia redimitella (Lienig & Zeller, 1846)
Lampronia rupella (Denis & Schiffermüller, 1775)

Psychidae
Acanthopsyche atra (Linnaeus, 1767)
Apterona helicoidella (Vallot, 1827)
Canephora hirsuta (Poda, 1761)
Dahlica lazuri (Clerck, 1759)
Dahlica triquetrella (Hübner, 1813)
Diplodoma laichartingella Goeze, 1783
Epichnopterix plumella (Denis & Schiffermüller, 1775)
Megalophanes viciella (Denis & Schiffermüller, 1775)
Narycia duplicella (Goeze, 1783)
Pachythelia villosella (Ochsenheimer, 1810)
Phalacropterix graslinella (Boisduval, 1852)
Proutia rotunda Suomalainen, 1990
Psyche casta (Pallas, 1767)
Psyche crassiorella Bruand, 1851
Siederia listerella (Linnaeus, 1758)
Sterrhopterix fusca (Haworth, 1809)
Sterrhopterix standfussi (Wocke, 1851)
Taleporia tubulosa (Retzius, 1783)

Pterophoridae
Adaina microdactyla (Hübner, 1813)
Agdistis adactyla (Hübner, 1819)
Amblyptilia acanthadactyla (Hübner, 1813)
Amblyptilia punctidactyla (Haworth, 1811)
Buckleria paludum (Zeller, 1839)
Capperia trichodactyla (Denis & Schiffermüller, 1775)
Cnaemidophorus rhododactyla (Denis & Schiffermüller, 1775)
Crombrugghia tristis (Zeller, 1841)
Emmelina monodactyla (Linnaeus, 1758)
Geina didactyla (Linnaeus, 1758)
Gillmeria ochrodactyla (Denis & Schiffermüller, 1775)
Gillmeria pallidactyla (Haworth, 1811)
Hellinsia didactylites (Strom, 1783)
Hellinsia lienigianus (Zeller, 1852)
Hellinsia osteodactylus (Zeller, 1841)
Hellinsia tephradactyla (Hübner, 1813)
Merrifieldia baliodactylus (Zeller, 1841)
Merrifieldia leucodactyla (Denis & Schiffermüller, 1775)
Merrifieldia tridactyla (Linnaeus, 1758)
Oxyptilus chrysodactyla (Denis & Schiffermüller, 1775)
Oxyptilus ericetorum (Stainton, 1851)
Oxyptilus parvidactyla (Haworth, 1811)
Oxyptilus pilosellae (Zeller, 1841)
Platyptilia calodactyla (Denis & Schiffermüller, 1775)
Platyptilia gonodactyla (Denis & Schiffermüller, 1775)
Platyptilia tesseradactyla (Linnaeus, 1761)
Pselnophorus heterodactyla (Muller, 1764)
Pterophorus pentadactyla (Linnaeus, 1758)
Stenoptilia bipunctidactyla (Scopoli, 1763)
Stenoptilia pterodactyla (Linnaeus, 1761)

Pyralidae
Achroia grisella (Fabricius, 1794)
Acrobasis advenella (Zincken, 1818)
Acrobasis consociella (Hübner, 1813)
Acrobasis repandana (Fabricius, 1798)
Acrobasis tumidana (Denis & Schiffermüller, 1775)
Aglossa pinguinalis (Linnaeus, 1758)
Anerastia lotella (Hübner, 1813)
Aphomia sociella (Linnaeus, 1758)
Aphomia zelleri de Joannis, 1932
Apomyelois bistriatella (Hulst, 1887)
Assara terebrella (Zincken, 1818)
Cryptoblabes bistriga (Haworth, 1811)
Delplanqueia dilutella (Denis & Schiffermüller, 1775)
Dioryctria abietella (Denis & Schiffermüller, 1775)
Dioryctria schuetzeella Fuchs, 1899
Dioryctria simplicella Heinemann, 1863
Dioryctria sylvestrella (Ratzeburg, 1840)
Eccopisa effractella Zeller, 1848
Elegia similella (Zincken, 1818)
Endotricha flammealis (Denis & Schiffermüller, 1775)
Ephestia elutella (Hübner, 1796)
Ephestia kuehniella Zeller, 1879
Episcythrastis tetricella (Denis & Schiffermüller, 1775)
Eurhodope cirrigerella (Zincken, 1818)
Eurhodope rosella (Scopoli, 1763)
Euzophera cinerosella (Zeller, 1839)
Euzophera fuliginosella (Heinemann, 1865)
Euzophera pinguis (Haworth, 1811)
Galleria mellonella (Linnaeus, 1758)
Glyptoteles leucacrinella Zeller, 1848
Homoeosoma nebulella (Denis & Schiffermüller, 1775)
Homoeosoma nimbella (Duponchel, 1837)
Homoeosoma sinuella (Fabricius, 1794)
Hypochalcia ahenella (Denis & Schiffermüller, 1775)
Hypochalcia lignella (Hübner, 1796)
Hypsopygia costalis (Fabricius, 1775)
Hypsopygia glaucinalis (Linnaeus, 1758)
Laodamia faecella (Zeller, 1839)
Matilella fusca (Haworth, 1811)
Moitrelia obductella (Zeller, 1839)
Myelois circumvoluta (Fourcroy, 1785)
Nyctegretis lineana (Scopoli, 1786)
Oncocera semirubella (Scopoli, 1763)
Ortholepis betulae (Goeze, 1778)
Ortholepis vacciniella (Lienig & Zeller, 1847)
Pempelia palumbella (Denis & Schiffermüller, 1775)
Pempeliella ornatella (Denis & Schiffermüller, 1775)
Phycitodes albatella (Ragonot, 1887)
Phycitodes binaevella (Hübner, 1813)
Phycitodes saxicola (Vaughan, 1870)
Pima boisduvaliella (Guenee, 1845)
Plodia interpunctella (Hübner, 1813)
Pyralis farinalis (Linnaeus, 1758)
Pyralis regalis Denis & Schiffermüller, 1775
Rhodophaea formosa (Haworth, 1811)
Salebriopsis albicilla (Herrich-Schäffer, 1849)
Sciota adelphella (Fischer v. Röslerstamm, 1836)
Sciota fumella (Eversmann, 1844)
Sciota hostilis (Stephens, 1834)
Sciota rhenella (Zincken, 1818)
Selagia argyrella (Denis & Schiffermüller, 1775)
Selagia spadicella (Hübner, 1796)
Synaphe punctalis (Fabricius, 1775)
Vitula biviella (Zeller, 1848)
Zophodia grossulariella (Hübner, 1809)

Roeslerstammiidae
Roeslerstammia erxlebella (Fabricius, 1787)
Roeslerstammia pronubella (Denis & Schiffermüller, 1775)

Saturniidae
Aglia tau (Linnaeus, 1758)
Saturnia pavonia (Linnaeus, 1758)

Schreckensteiniidae
Schreckensteinia festaliella (Hübner, 1819)

Scythrididae
Scythris cicadella (Zeller, 1839)
Scythris empetrella Karsholt & Nielsen, 1976
Scythris inspersella (Hübner, 1817)
Scythris laminella (Denis & Schiffermüller, 1775)
Scythris limbella (Fabricius, 1775)
Scythris palustris (Zeller, 1855)
Scythris potentillella (Zeller, 1847)
Scythris sinensis (Felder & Rogenhofer, 1875)

Sesiidae
Bembecia ichneumoniformis (Denis & Schiffermüller, 1775)
Paranthrene tabaniformis (Rottemburg, 1775)
Pennisetia hylaeiformis (Laspeyres, 1801)
Pyropteron triannuliformis (Freyer, 1843)
Sesia apiformis (Clerck, 1759)
Sesia bembeciformis (Hübner, 1806)
Sesia melanocephala Dalman, 1816
Synanthedon culiciformis (Linnaeus, 1758)
Synanthedon flaviventris (Staudinger, 1883)
Synanthedon formicaeformis (Esper, 1783)
Synanthedon mesiaeformis (Herrich-Schäffer, 1846)
Synanthedon myopaeformis (Borkhausen, 1789)
Synanthedon scoliaeformis (Borkhausen, 1789)
Synanthedon spheciformis (Denis & Schiffermüller, 1775)
Synanthedon stomoxiformis (Hübner, 1790)
Synanthedon tipuliformis (Clerck, 1759)
Synanthedon vespiformis (Linnaeus, 1761)

Sphingidae
Acherontia atropos (Linnaeus, 1758)
Agrius convolvuli (Linnaeus, 1758)
Daphnis nerii (Linnaeus, 1758)
Deilephila elpenor (Linnaeus, 1758)
Deilephila porcellus (Linnaeus, 1758)
Hemaris fuciformis (Linnaeus, 1758)
Hemaris tityus (Linnaeus, 1758)
Hyles euphorbiae (Linnaeus, 1758)
Hyles gallii (Rottemburg, 1775)
Hyles livornica (Esper, 1780)
Laothoe amurensis (Staudinger, 1879)
Laothoe populi (Linnaeus, 1758)
Macroglossum stellatarum (Linnaeus, 1758)
Mimas tiliae (Linnaeus, 1758)
Smerinthus ocellata (Linnaeus, 1758)
Sphinx ligustri Linnaeus, 1758
Sphinx pinastri Linnaeus, 1758

Stathmopodidae
Stathmopoda pedella (Linnaeus, 1761)

Tineidae
Archinemapogon yildizae Kocak, 1981
Haplotinea ditella (Pierce & Metcalfe, 1938)
Haplotinea insectella (Fabricius, 1794)
Infurcitinea ignicomella (Zeller, 1852)
Monopis fenestratella (Heyden, 1863)
Monopis imella (Hübner, 1813)
Monopis laevigella (Denis & Schiffermüller, 1775)
Monopis obviella (Denis & Schiffermüller, 1775)
Monopis spilotella (Tengstrom, 1848)
Monopis weaverella (Scott, 1858)
Montescardia tessulatellus (Zeller, 1846)
Morophaga choragella (Denis & Schiffermüller, 1775)
Nemapogon clematella (Fabricius, 1781)
Nemapogon cloacella (Haworth, 1828)
Nemapogon granella (Linnaeus, 1758)
Nemapogon nigralbella (Zeller, 1839)
Nemapogon picarella (Clerck, 1759)
Nemapogon variatella (Clemens, 1859)
Niditinea fuscella (Linnaeus, 1758)
Scardia boletella (Fabricius, 1794)
Stenoptinea cyaneimarmorella (Milliere, 1854)
Tinea pellionella Linnaeus, 1758
Tinea semifulvella Haworth, 1828
Tinea svenssoni Opheim, 1965
Tinea translucens Meyrick, 1917
Tinea trinotella Thunberg, 1794
Tineola bisselliella (Hummel, 1823)
Triaxomera fulvimitrella (Sodoffsky, 1830)
Triaxomera parasitella (Hübner, 1796)
Trichophaga scandinaviella Zagulajev, 1960

Tischeriidae
Tischeria dodonaea Stainton, 1858
Tischeria ekebladella (Bjerkander, 1795)

Tortricidae
Acleris aspersana (Hübner, 1817)
Acleris bergmanniana (Linnaeus, 1758)
Acleris comariana (Lienig & Zeller, 1846)
Acleris cristana (Denis & Schiffermüller, 1775)
Acleris effractana (Hübner, 1799)
Acleris emargana (Fabricius, 1775)
Acleris ferrugana (Denis & Schiffermüller, 1775)
Acleris fimbriana (Thunberg, 1791)
Acleris forsskaleana (Linnaeus, 1758)
Acleris hastiana (Linnaeus, 1758)
Acleris holmiana (Linnaeus, 1758)
Acleris hyemana (Haworth, 1811)
Acleris laterana (Fabricius, 1794)
Acleris lipsiana (Denis & Schiffermüller, 1775)
Acleris logiana (Clerck, 1759)
Acleris lorquiniana (Duponchel, 1835)
Acleris maccana (Treitschke, 1835)
Acleris notana (Donovan, 1806)
Acleris rhombana (Denis & Schiffermüller, 1775)
Acleris roscidana (Hübner, 1799)
Acleris rufana (Denis & Schiffermüller, 1775)
Acleris scabrana (Denis & Schiffermüller, 1775)
Acleris schalleriana (Linnaeus, 1761)
Acleris shepherdana (Stephens, 1852)
Acleris sparsana (Denis & Schiffermüller, 1775)
Acleris umbrana (Hübner, 1799)
Acleris variegana (Denis & Schiffermüller, 1775)
Adoxophyes orana (Fischer v. Röslerstamm, 1834)
Aethes cnicana (Westwood, 1854)
Aethes dilucidana (Stephens, 1852)
Aethes fennicana (M. Hering, 1924)
Aethes flagellana (Duponchel, 1836)
Aethes francillana (Fabricius, 1794)
Aethes hartmanniana (Clerck, 1759)
Aethes kindermanniana (Treitschke, 1830)
Aethes margaritana (Haworth, 1811)
Aethes rubigana (Treitschke, 1830)
Aethes rutilana (Hübner, 1817)
Aethes smeathmanniana (Fabricius, 1781)
Aethes tesserana (Denis & Schiffermüller, 1775)
Aethes triangulana (Treitschke, 1835)
Agapeta hamana (Linnaeus, 1758)
Agapeta zoegana (Linnaeus, 1767)
Aleimma loeflingiana (Linnaeus, 1758)
Ancylis achatana (Denis & Schiffermüller, 1775)
Ancylis apicella (Denis & Schiffermüller, 1775)
Ancylis badiana (Denis & Schiffermüller, 1775)
Ancylis comptana (Frolich, 1828)
Ancylis diminutana (Haworth, 1811)
Ancylis geminana (Donovan, 1806)
Ancylis kenneli Kuznetsov, 1962
Ancylis laetana (Fabricius, 1775)
Ancylis mitterbacheriana (Denis & Schiffermüller, 1775)
Ancylis myrtillana (Treitschke, 1830)
Ancylis obtusana (Haworth, 1811)
Ancylis selenana (Guenee, 1845)
Ancylis subarcuana (Douglas, 1847)
Ancylis tineana (Hübner, 1799)
Ancylis uncella (Denis & Schiffermüller, 1775)
Ancylis unculana (Haworth, 1811)
Ancylis unguicella (Linnaeus, 1758)
Ancylis upupana (Treitschke, 1835)
Aphelia viburniana (Denis & Schiffermüller, 1775)
Aphelia paleana (Hübner, 1793)
Aphelia unitana (Hübner, 1799)
Apotomis betuletana (Haworth, 1811)
Apotomis capreana (Hübner, 1817)
Apotomis infida (Heinrich, 1926)
Apotomis inundana (Denis & Schiffermüller, 1775)
Apotomis sauciana (Frolich, 1828)
Apotomis semifasciana (Haworth, 1811)
Apotomis sororculana (Zetterstedt, 1839)
Apotomis turbidana Hübner, 1825
Archips betulana (Hübner, 1787)
Archips crataegana (Hübner, 1799)
Archips oporana (Linnaeus, 1758)
Archips podana (Scopoli, 1763)
Archips rosana (Linnaeus, 1758)
Archips xylosteana (Linnaeus, 1758)
Argyroploce arbutella (Linnaeus, 1758)
Argyroploce externa (Eversmann, 1844)
Argyroploce lediana (Linnaeus, 1758)
Argyroploce roseomaculana (Herrich-Schäffer, 1851)
Argyrotaenia ljungiana (Thunberg, 1797)
Aterpia corticana (Denis & Schiffermüller, 1775)
Bactra furfurana (Haworth, 1811)
Bactra lacteana Caradja, 1916
Bactra lancealana (Hübner, 1799)
Bactra suedana Bengtsson, 1989
Capricornia boisduvaliana (Duponchel, 1836)
Capua vulgana (Frolich, 1828)
Celypha cespitana (Hübner, 1817)
Celypha flavipalpana (Herrich-Schäffer, 1851)
Celypha lacunana (Denis & Schiffermüller, 1775)
Celypha rivulana (Scopoli, 1763)
Celypha rosaceana Schlager, 1847
Celypha rufana (Scopoli, 1763)
Celypha siderana (Treitschke, 1835)
Celypha striana (Denis & Schiffermüller, 1775)
Celypha tiedemanniana (Zeller, 1845)
Choristoneura diversana (Hübner, 1817)
Choristoneura hebenstreitella (Muller, 1764)
Choristoneura murinana (Hübner, 1799)
Clepsis neglectana (Herrich-Schäffer, 1851)
Clepsis pallidana (Fabricius, 1776)
Clepsis rurinana (Linnaeus, 1758)
Clepsis senecionana (Hübner, 1819)
Clepsis spectrana (Treitschke, 1830)
Cnephasia alticolana (Herrich-Schäffer, 1851)
Cnephasia asseclana (Denis & Schiffermüller, 1775)
Cnephasia communana (Herrich-Schäffer, 1851)
Cnephasia pasiuana (Hübner, 1799)
Cnephasia stephensiana (Doubleday, 1849)
Cnephasia abrasana (Duponchel, 1843)
Cnephasia incertana (Treitschke, 1835)
Cochylidia heydeniana (Herrich-Schäffer, 1851)
Cochylidia implicitana (Wocke, 1856)
Cochylidia moguntiana (Rossler, 1864)
Cochylidia richteriana (Fischer v. Röslerstamm, 1837)
Cochylidia rupicola (Curtis, 1834)
Cochylidia subroseana (Haworth, 1811)
Cochylimorpha alternana (Stephens, 1834)
Cochylimorpha hilarana (Herrich-Schäffer, 1851)
Cochylimorpha straminea (Haworth, 1811)
Cochylis dubitana (Hübner, 1799)
Cochylis epilinana Duponchel, 1842
Cochylis flaviciliana (Westwood, 1854)
Cochylis nana (Haworth, 1811)
Cochylis posterana Zeller, 1847
Cydia adenocarpi (Ragonot, 1875)
Cydia coniferana (Saxesen, 1840)
Cydia corollana (Hübner, 1823)
Cydia cosmophorana (Treitschke, 1835)
Cydia duplicana (Zetterstedt, 1839)
Cydia illutana (Herrich-Schäffer, 1851)
Cydia indivisa (Danilevsky, 1963)
Cydia inquinatana (Hübner, 1800)
Cydia medicaginis (Kuznetsov, 1962)
Cydia nigricana (Fabricius, 1794)
Cydia oxytropidis (Martini, 1912)
Cydia pactolana (Zeller, 1840)
Cydia pomonella (Linnaeus, 1758)
Cydia servillana (Duponchel, 1836)
Cydia splendana (Hübner, 1799)
Cydia strobilella (Linnaeus, 1758)
Cydia succedana (Denis & Schiffermüller, 1775)
Cymolomia hartigiana (Saxesen, 1840)
Dichelia histrionana (Frolich, 1828)
Dichrorampha acuminatana (Lienig & Zeller, 1846)
Dichrorampha aeratana (Pierce & Metcalfe, 1915)
Dichrorampha agilana (Tengstrom, 1848)
Dichrorampha alpinana (Treitschke, 1830)
Dichrorampha consortana Stephens, 1852
Dichrorampha flavidorsana Knaggs, 1867
Dichrorampha incognitana (Kremky & Maslowski, 1933)
Dichrorampha petiverella (Linnaeus, 1758)
Dichrorampha plumbagana (Treitschke, 1830)
Dichrorampha plumbana (Scopoli, 1763)
Dichrorampha senectana Guenee, 1845
Dichrorampha simpliciana (Haworth, 1811)
Dichrorampha vancouverana McDunnough, 1935
Doloploca punctulana (Denis & Schiffermüller, 1775)
Eana derivana (de La Harpe, 1858)
Eana incanana (Stephens, 1852)
Eana penziana (Thunberg, 1791)
Eana argentana (Clerck, 1759)
Eana osseana (Scopoli, 1763)
Enarmonia formosana (Scopoli, 1763)
Endothenia ericetana (Humphreys & Westwood, 1845)
Endothenia marginana (Haworth, 1811)
Endothenia nigricostana (Haworth, 1811)
Endothenia quadrimaculana (Haworth, 1811)
Endothenia sororiana (Herrich-Schäffer, 1850)
Endothenia ustulana (Haworth, 1811)
Epagoge grotiana (Fabricius, 1781)
Epiblema foenella (Linnaeus, 1758)
Epiblema grandaevana (Lienig & Zeller, 1846)
Epiblema graphana (Treitschke, 1835)
Epiblema scutulana (Denis & Schiffermüller, 1775)
Epiblema similana (Denis & Schiffermüller, 1775)
Epiblema sticticana (Fabricius, 1794)
Epinotia abbreviana (Fabricius, 1794)
Epinotia bilunana (Haworth, 1811)
Epinotia brunnichana (Linnaeus, 1767)
Epinotia caprana (Fabricius, 1798)
Epinotia cruciana (Linnaeus, 1761)
Epinotia demarniana (Fischer v. Röslerstamm, 1840)
Epinotia granitana (Herrich-Schäffer, 1851)
Epinotia immundana (Fischer v. Röslerstamm, 1839)
Epinotia maculana (Fabricius, 1775)
Epinotia nanana (Treitschke, 1835)
Epinotia nemorivaga (Tengstrom, 1848)
Epinotia nisella (Clerck, 1759)
Epinotia pygmaeana (Hübner, 1799)
Epinotia ramella (Linnaeus, 1758)
Epinotia rubiginosana (Herrich-Schäffer, 1851)
Epinotia signatana (Douglas, 1845)
Epinotia solandriana (Linnaeus, 1758)
Epinotia sordidana (Hübner, 1824)
Epinotia subocellana (Donovan, 1806)
Epinotia tedella (Clerck, 1759)
Epinotia tenerana (Denis & Schiffermüller, 1775)
Epinotia tetraquetrana (Haworth, 1811)
Eriopsela quadrana (Hübner, 1813)
Eucosma aemulana (Schlager, 1849)
Eucosma albidulana (Herrich-Schäffer, 1851)
Eucosma aspidiscana (Hübner, 1817)
Eucosma campoliliana (Denis & Schiffermüller, 1775)
Eucosma cana (Haworth, 1811)
Eucosma conterminana (Guenee, 1845)
Eucosma hohenwartiana (Denis & Schiffermüller, 1775)
Eucosma messingiana (Fischer v. Röslerstamm, 1837)
Eucosma metzneriana (Treitschke, 1830)
Eucosma obumbratana (Lienig & Zeller, 1846)
Eucosma pupillana (Clerck, 1759)
Eucosma wimmerana (Treitschke, 1835)
Eucosmomorpha albersana (Hübner, 1813)
Eudemis porphyrana (Hübner, 1799)
Eudemis profundana (Denis & Schiffermüller, 1775)
Eulia ministrana (Linnaeus, 1758)
Eupoecilia ambiguella (Hübner, 1796)
Eupoecilia angustana (Hübner, 1799)
Eupoecilia cebrana (Hübner, 1813)
Exapate congelatella (Clerck, 1759)
Falseuncaria degreyana (McLachlan, 1869)
Falseuncaria ruficiliana (Haworth, 1811)
Gibberifera simplana (Fischer v. Röslerstamm, 1836)
Grapholita funebrana Treitschke, 1835
Grapholita molesta (Busck, 1916)
Grapholita tenebrosana Duponchel, 1843
Grapholita compositella (Fabricius, 1775)
Grapholita discretana Wocke, 1861
Grapholita jungiella (Clerck, 1759)
Grapholita lunulana (Denis & Schiffermüller, 1775)
Grapholita nebritana Treitschke, 1830
Grapholita orobana Treitschke, 1830
Grapholita pallifrontana Lienig & Zeller, 1846
Gravitarmata margarotana (Heinemann, 1863)
Gynnidomorpha alismana (Ragonot, 1883)
Gynnidomorpha minimana (Caradja, 1916)
Gynnidomorpha permixtana (Denis & Schiffermüller, 1775)
Gynnidomorpha vectisana (Humphreys & Westwood, 1845)
Gypsonoma dealbana (Frolich, 1828)
Gypsonoma minutana (Hübner, 1799)
Gypsonoma nitidulana (Lienig & Zeller, 1846)
Gypsonoma oppressana (Treitschke, 1835)
Gypsonoma sociana (Haworth, 1811)
Hedya dimidiana (Clerck, 1759)
Hedya nubiferana (Haworth, 1811)
Hedya ochroleucana (Frolich, 1828)
Hedya pruniana (Hübner, 1799)
Hedya salicella (Linnaeus, 1758)
Lathronympha strigana (Fabricius, 1775)
Lepteucosma huebneriana Kocak, 1980
Lobesia artemisiana (Zeller, 1847)
Lobesia botrana (Denis & Schiffermüller, 1775)
Lobesia reliquana (Hübner, 1825)
Lozotaenia forsterana (Fabricius, 1781)
Metendothenia atropunctana (Zetterstedt, 1839)
Neosphaleroptera nubilana (Hübner, 1799)
Notocelia cynosbatella (Linnaeus, 1758)
Notocelia incarnatana (Hübner, 1800)
Notocelia roborana (Denis & Schiffermüller, 1775)
Notocelia rosaecolana (Doubleday, 1850)
Notocelia trimaculana (Haworth, 1811)
Notocelia uddmanniana (Linnaeus, 1758)
Olethreutes arcuella (Clerck, 1759)
Olindia schumacherana (Fabricius, 1787)
Orthotaenia undulana (Denis & Schiffermüller, 1775)
Pammene argyrana (Hübner, 1799)
Pammene fasciana (Linnaeus, 1761)
Pammene gallicana (Guenee, 1845)
Pammene germmana (Hübner, 1799)
Pammene ignorata Kuznetsov, 1968
Pammene insulana (Guenee, 1845)
Pammene luedersiana (Sorhagen, 1885)
Pammene obscurana (Stephens, 1834)
Pammene populana (Fabricius, 1787)
Pammene rhediella (Clerck, 1759)
Pammene spiniana (Duponchel, 1843)
Pandemis cerasana (Hübner, 1786)
Pandemis cinnamomeana (Treitschke, 1830)
Pandemis corylana (Fabricius, 1794)
Pandemis dumetana (Treitschke, 1835)
Pandemis heparana (Denis & Schiffermüller, 1775)
Paramesia gnomana (Clerck, 1759)
Pelochrista agrestana (Treitschke, 1830)
Pelochrista caecimaculana (Hübner, 1799)
Pelochrista huebneriana (Lienig & Zeller, 1846)
Pelochrista infidana (Hübner, 1824)
Periclepsis cinctana (Denis & Schiffermüller, 1775)
Phalonidia curvistrigana (Stainton, 1859)
Phalonidia gilvicomana (Zeller, 1847)
Phalonidia manniana (Fischer v. Röslerstamm, 1839)
Phiaris bipunctana (Fabricius, 1794)
Phiaris dissolutana (Stange, 1866)
Phiaris metallicana (Hübner, 1799)
Phiaris micana (Denis & Schiffermüller, 1775)
Phiaris palustrana (Lienig & Zeller, 1846)
Phiaris schulziana (Fabricius, 1776)
Phiaris turfosana (Herrich-Schäffer, 1851)
Phiaris umbrosana (Freyer, 1842)
Philedone gerningana (Denis & Schiffermüller, 1775)
Philedonides lunana (Thunberg, 1784)
Phtheochroa inopiana (Haworth, 1811)
Phtheochroa sodaliana (Haworth, 1811)
Piniphila bifasciana (Haworth, 1811)
Pristerognatha fuligana (Denis & Schiffermüller, 1775)
Pristerognatha penthinana (Guenee, 1845)
Pseudargyrotoza conwagana (Fabricius, 1775)
Pseudococcyx posticana (Zetterstedt, 1839)
Pseudococcyx turionella (Linnaeus, 1758)
Pseudohermenias abietana (Fabricius, 1787)
Pseudosciaphila branderiana (Linnaeus, 1758)
Ptycholoma lecheana (Linnaeus, 1758)
Ptycholomoides aeriferana (Herrich-Schäffer, 1851)
Retinia resinella (Linnaeus, 1758)
Rhopobota myrtillana (Humphreys & Westwood, 1845)
Rhopobota naevana (Hübner, 1817)
Rhopobota stagnana (Denis & Schiffermüller, 1775)
Rhopobota ustomaculana (Curtis, 1831)
Rhyacionia buoliana (Denis & Schiffermüller, 1775)
Rhyacionia duplana (Hübner, 1813)
Rhyacionia pinicolana (Doubleday, 1849)
Rhyacionia pinivorana (Lienig & Zeller, 1846)
Selenodes karelica (Tengstrom, 1875)
Sparganothis pilleriana (Denis & Schiffermüller, 1775)
Spatalistis bifasciana (Hübner, 1787)
Spilonota laricana (Heinemann, 1863)
Spilonota ocellana (Denis & Schiffermüller, 1775)
Stictea mygindiana (Denis & Schiffermüller, 1775)
Strophedra nitidana (Fabricius, 1794)
Syndemis musculana (Hübner, 1799)
Thiodia citrana (Hübner, 1799)
Thiodia lerneana (Treitschke, 1835)
Tortricodes alternella (Denis & Schiffermüller, 1775)
Tortrix viridana Linnaeus, 1758
Xerocnephasia rigana (Sodoffsky, 1829)
Zeiraphera griseana (Hübner, 1799)
Zeiraphera isertana (Fabricius, 1794)
Zeiraphera ratzeburgiana (Saxesen, 1840)

Yponomeutidae
Cedestis gysseleniella Zeller, 1839
Cedestis subfasciella (Stephens, 1834)
Euhyponomeutoides albithoracellus Gaj, 1954
Kessleria fasciapennella (Stainton, 1849)
Ocnerostoma friesei Svensson, 1966
Paraswammerdamia conspersella (Tengstrom, 1848)
Scythropia crataegella (Linnaeus, 1767)
Swammerdamia compunctella Herrich-Schäffer, 1855
Swammerdamia pyrella (Villers, 1789)
Yponomeuta cagnagella (Hübner, 1813)
Yponomeuta evonymella (Linnaeus, 1758)
Yponomeuta irrorella (Hübner, 1796)
Yponomeuta malinellus Zeller, 1838
Yponomeuta padella (Linnaeus, 1758)
Yponomeuta plumbella (Denis & Schiffermüller, 1775)
Yponomeuta rorrella (Hübner, 1796)
Yponomeuta sedella Treitschke, 1832

Ypsolophidae
Ochsenheimeria vacculella Fischer von Röslerstamm, 1842
Ypsolopha asperella (Linnaeus, 1761)
Ypsolopha chazariella (Mann, 1866)
Ypsolopha dentella (Fabricius, 1775)
Ypsolopha falcella (Denis & Schiffermüller, 1775)
Ypsolopha horridella (Treitschke, 1835)
Ypsolopha lucella (Fabricius, 1775)
Ypsolopha nemorella (Linnaeus, 1758)
Ypsolopha parenthesella (Linnaeus, 1761)
Ypsolopha scabrella (Linnaeus, 1761)
Ypsolopha sequella (Clerck, 1759)
Ypsolopha sylvella (Linnaeus, 1767)
Ypsolopha ustella (Clerck, 1759)
Ypsolopha vittella (Linnaeus, 1758)

Zygaenidae
Adscita statices (Linnaeus, 1758)
Rhagades pruni (Denis & Schiffermüller, 1775)
Zygaena minos (Denis & Schiffermüller, 1775)
Zygaena purpuralis (Brunnich, 1763)
Zygaena angelicae Ochsenheimer, 1808
Zygaena ephialtes (Linnaeus, 1767)
Zygaena filipendulae (Linnaeus, 1758)
Zygaena lonicerae (Scheven, 1777)
Zygaena loti (Denis & Schiffermüller, 1775)
Zygaena osterodensis Reiss, 1921
Zygaena viciae (Denis & Schiffermüller, 1775)

References

External links
Fauna Europaea

Lithuania
Lithuania
Lithuania
Lists of invertebrates of Europe
Fauna of Lithuania
Lepidoptera
 Lithuania